= 2024 United States gubernatorial elections =

- November 5, 2024; November 19 (American Samoa)

13 governorships 11 states; 2 territories
	Majority party	Minority party
Party	Republican	Democratic
Seats before	27	23
Seats after	27	23
Seat change	Steady	Steady
Popular vote	10,031,977	9,242,906
Percentage	49.7%	45.8%
Seats up	8	3
Seats won	8	3
- Democratic hold Republican hold New Progressive hold Nonpartisan; No election

United States gubernatorial elections were held on November 5, 2024, in 11 states and two territories. The previous gubernatorial elections for this group of states took place in 2020, except in New Hampshire and Vermont, where governors only serve two-year terms and elected their governors in 2022. In addition to state gubernatorial elections, the territories of American Samoa and Puerto Rico held elections for their governors. This was also the first time since 1988 that a Republican nominee won the gubernatorial election in American Samoa and also the first time since 1996 that an incumbent governor there lost re-election. Also, this was the first time since 2008 that a Republican-affialiated nominee won a gubernatorial election in Puerto Rico.

The elections took place concurrently with the 2024 presidential election, elections to the House of Representatives and Senate, and numerous state and local elections. This was the first election cycle since 2017 that no incumbent Democratic governors ran for re-election. (Note: This figure does not include the governors of American Samoa and Puerto Rico, both of which ran for re-election. However, they only affiliate with the Democratic Party on the federal level, and associate differently on the territorial level.) With the primary defeat of Puerto Rico governor Pedro Pierluisi, this was also the first cycle since 2020 in which an incumbent governor lost renomination, also in Puerto Rico. This was the first election cycle since 2015 in which there was no net change in state governorships held by either party, and the first since 2011 in which no seat changed parties. However, both territorial gubernatorial seats flipped from Democratic-affiliated to Republican-affiliated control. (Note: Although Puerto Rico governor Jenniffer González-Colón is affiliated with Republicans and former governor Pedro Pierluisi is affiliated with Democrats, both are from the same Puerto Rican political party, the New Progressive Party.)

== Partisan composition ==
Going into the election, there were 27 Republican governors and 23 Democratic governors in the United States. This class of governors was made up of 8 Republicans and 3 Democrats. Republicans were defending two governorships in states that Joe Biden won in 2020 (New Hampshire and Vermont) while Democrats were defending one governorship in a state that Donald Trump won in 2020 (North Carolina).

Both the parties successfully defended their seats. The Republicans defended New Hampshire and Vermont successfully despite Kamala Harris winning from there in the concurrent presidential election. The Democrats defended their seat of North Carolina despite Donald Trump winning from there in the concurrent presidential election.

Republicans also made inroads in American Samoa as they flipped the seat from the Democrats.

== Election predictions ==
Several sites and individuals published predictions of competitive seats. These predictions looked at factors such as the strength of the incumbent (if the incumbent runs for re-election), the strength of the candidates, and the partisan leanings of the state (reflected in part by the state's Cook Partisan Voting Index rating). The predictions assigned ratings to each seat, with the rating indicating a party's predicted advantage in winning that seat.

Most election predictors use:

- "tossup": no advantage
- "tilt" (used by some predictors): advantage that is not quite as strong as "lean"
- "lean": slight advantage
- "likely": significant, but surmountable, advantage
- "safe" or "solid": near-certain chance of victory

State	PVI	Incumbent	Last race	Cook October 15, 2024	IE September 26, 2024	Sabato November 4, 2024	RCP October 1, 2024	ED November 4, 2024	CNalysis November 1, 2024	Result
Delaware	D+7	John Carney (term-limited)	59.5% D	Solid D	Solid D	Safe D	Solid D	Safe D	Solid D	Meyer; 56.1% D
Indiana	R+11	Eric Holcomb (term-limited)	56.5% R	Likely R	Likely R	Likely R	Likely R	Safe R	Likely R	Braun; 54.4% R
Missouri	R+10	Mike Parson (term-limited)	57.1% R	Solid R	Solid R	Safe R	Likely R	Safe R	Solid R	Kehoe; 59.2% R
Montana	R+11	Greg Gianforte	54.4% R	Solid R	Solid R	Safe R	Likely R	Safe R	Solid R	Gianforte; 58.9% R
New Hampshire	D+1	Chris Sununu (retiring)	57.0% R	Tossup	Tossup	Lean R	Tossup	Lean R	Tilt R	Ayotte; 53.6% R
North Carolina	R+3	Roy Cooper (term-limited)	51.5% D	Likely D	Likely D	Likely D	Likely D	Safe D	Solid D	Stein; 54.9% D
North Dakota	R+20	Doug Burgum (retiring)	65.8% R	Solid R	Solid R	Safe R	Solid R	Safe R	Solid R	Armstrong; 68.4% R
Utah	R+13	Spencer Cox	63.0% R	Solid R	Solid R	Safe R	Solid R	Safe R	Solid R	Cox; 52.9% R
Vermont	D+16	Phil Scott	70.9% R	Solid R	Solid R	Safe R	Solid R	Safe R	Solid R	Scott; 73.4% R
Washington	D+8	Jay Inslee (retiring)	56.6% D	Likely D	Likely D	Likely D	Likely D	Safe D	Solid D	Ferguson; 55.7% D
West Virginia	R+22	Jim Justice (term-limited)	63.5% R	Solid R	Solid R	Safe R	Solid R	Safe R	Solid R	Morrisey; 62.0% R

== Race summary ==
=== States ===
State	Governor	Party	First elected	Status	Candidates
Delaware	John Carney	Democratic	2016	Incumbent term-limited. Democratic hold.	▌ ✓ Matt Meyer (Democratic) 56.1%; ▌Michael Ramone (Republican) 43.9%
Indiana	Eric Holcomb	Republican	2016	Incumbent term-limited. Republican hold.	▌ ✓ Mike Braun (Republican) 54.4%; ▌Jennifer McCormick (Democratic) 41.1%; ▌Donald Rainwater (Libertarian) 4.5%
Missouri	Mike Parson	Republican	2018 (Note: Parson took office in 2018 after his predecessor (Eric Greitens) resigned. He was subsequently elected in the 2020 Missouri gubernatorial election.)	Incumbent term-limited. Republican hold.	▌ ✓ Mike Kehoe (Republican) 59.2%; ▌Crystal Quade (Democratic) 38.7%; Others: ▌Bill Slantz (Libertarian) 1.4%; ▌Paul Lehmann (Green) 0.8%
Montana	Greg Gianforte	Republican	2020	Incumbent re-elected.	▌ ✓ Greg Gianforte (Republican) 58.9%; ▌Ryan Busse (Democratic) 38.6%; ▌Kaiser Leib (Libertarian) 2.5%
New Hampshire	Chris Sununu	Republican	2016	Incumbent retired. Republican hold.	▌ ✓ Kelly Ayotte (Republican) 53.6%; ▌Joyce Craig (Democratic) 44.3%; ▌Stephen Villee (Libertarian) 2.1%
North Carolina	Roy Cooper	Democratic	2016	Incumbent term-limited. Democratic hold.	▌ ✓ Josh Stein (Democratic) 54.9%; ▌Mark Robinson (Republican) 40.1%; ▌Mike Ross (Libertarian) 3.2%; Others: ▌Vinny Smith (Constitution) 1.0%; ▌Wayne Turner (Green) 0.9%
North Dakota	Doug Burgum	Republican	2016	Incumbent retired. Republican hold.	▌ ✓ Kelly Armstrong (Republican) 68.4%; ▌Merrill Piepkorn (Democratic–NPL) 26.0%; ▌Michael Coachman (Independent) 5.6%
Utah	Spencer Cox	Republican	2020	Incumbent re-elected.	▌ ✓ Spencer Cox (Republican) 52.9%; ▌Brian King (Democratic) 28.5%; ▌Phil Lyman (Write-in) 13.4%; ▌Robert Latham (Libertarian) 2.8%; Others: ▌Tommy Williams (Independent American) 1.9%; ▌Tom Tomeny (Independent) 0.4%
Vermont	Phil Scott	Republican	2016	Incumbent re-elected.	▌ ✓ Phil Scott (Republican) 73.4%; ▌Esther Charlestin (Democratic) 21.8%; ▌Kevin Hoyt (Independent) 2.6%; Others: ▌June Goodband (Green Mountain) 1.2%; ▌Eli Mutino (Independent) 0.7%
Washington	Jay Inslee	Democratic	2012	Incumbent retired. Democratic hold.	▌ ✓ Bob Ferguson (Democratic) 55.7%; ▌Dave Reichert (Republican) 44.3%
West Virginia	Jim Justice	Republican	2016 (Note: Governor Jim Justice was originally elected as a Democrat before switching back to a Republican in 2017. Justice won re-election as a Republican in 2020.)	Incumbent term-limited. Republican hold.	▌ ✓ Patrick Morrisey (Republican) 62.0%; ▌Steve Williams (Democratic) 31.6%; ▌Erika Kolenich (Libertarian) 2.9%; ▌Marshall Wilson (Constitution) 2.3%; ▌Chase Linko-Looper (Mountain) 1.3%

=== Territories ===
State	Governor	Party	First elected	Status	Candidates
American Samoa	Lemanu Peleti Mauga	Democratic (Note: The governor of American Samoa is elected on a nonpartisan basis, although individuals do affiliate with national parties. In Pula's case, this is with the Republican Party and in Mauga's case with the Democratic Party.)	2020	Incumbent lost re-election. Republican gain.	First round: ▌ Pula Nikolao Pula (Nonpartisan) 42.4%; ▌ Lemanu Peleti Mauga (Nonpartisan) 36.2%; ▌Vaitautolu Talia Iaulualo (Nonpartisan) 21.4%; Runoff: ▌ ✓ Pula Nikolao Pula (Nonpartisan) 59.8%; ▌Lemanu Peleti Mauga (Nonpartisan) 40.2%
Puerto Rico	Pedro Pierluisi	New Progressive (Note: Pierluisi affiliates with the Democratic Party on the national level; González-Colón affiliates with the Republican Party at National Level.)	2020	Incumbent lost renomination. New Progressive hold.	▌ ✓ Jenniffer González-Colón (PNP) 41.2%; ▌Juan Dalmau (PIP) 30.8%; ▌Jesús Manuel Ortiz (PPD) 21.5%; ▌Javier Jiménez (PD) 6.4%; ▌Javier Córdova Iturregui (MVC) 0.1%

== Closest states ==
States where the margin of victory was between 5% and 10%:

1. New Hampshire, 9.26%

Red denotes states won by Republicans.

== Delaware ==
Delaware gubernatorial election
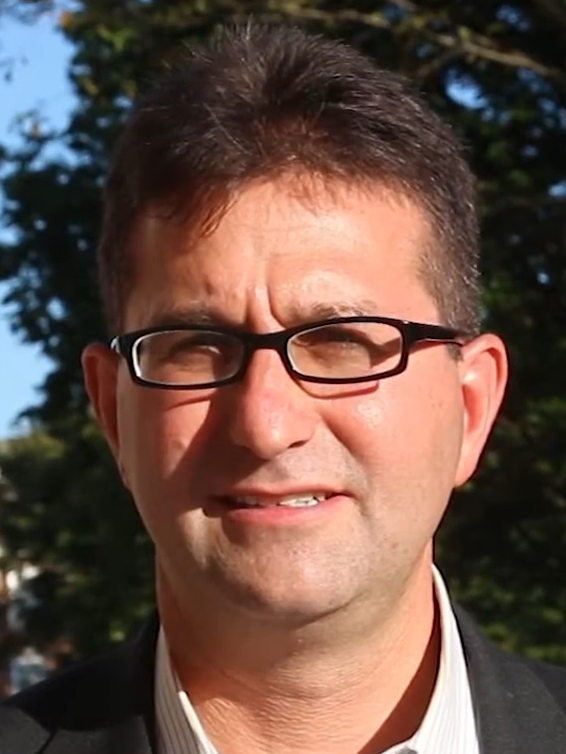

Nominee	Matt Meyer	Mike Ramone
Party	Democratic	Republican
Popular vote	279,585	219,050
Percentage	56.07%	43.93%
- County results Meyer: 50–60% 60–70% Ramone: 50–60%
Governor before election
John Carney
Democratic
Elected Governor
Matt Meyer
Democratic

Governor John Carney was re-elected to a second term in 2020 with 59.5% of the vote. He was term-limited by the Delaware Constitution in 2024 and could not seek re-election for a third term. New Castle County Executive Matt Meyer defeated Lieutenant Governor Bethany Hall-Long and President of the National Wildlife Federation and former secretary of the Delaware Department of Natural Resources and Environmental Control Collin O'Mara for the Democratic nomination and state House Minority Leader Michael Ramone defeated Police Officer Jerry Price and Contactor Bobby Williamson for the Republican nomination.

Meyer comfortably won the election, albeit by the closest margin since 2004. Meyer's 56% of the vote is the lowest for the Democrats since that election, while Ramone's 44% is the highest since for Republicans.

Democratic primary results
Party	Candidate	Votes	%
Democratic	Matt Meyer	40,518	46.98%
Democratic	Bethany Hall-Long	31,588	36.62%
Democratic	Collin O'Mara	14,142	16.40%
Total votes		86,248	100.0%

Republican primary results
Party	Candidate	Votes	%
Republican	Mike Ramone	26,414	72.29%
Republican	Jerry Price	5,971	16.34%
Republican	Bobby Williamson	4,153	11.37%
Total votes		36,538	100.0%

2024 Delaware gubernatorial election
Party	Candidate	Votes	%	±%
Democratic	Matt Meyer	279,585	56.07%	−3.39%
Republican	Mike Ramone	219,050	43.93%	+5.30%
Total votes		498,635	100.00%	
Democratic hold				

== Indiana ==
Indiana gubernatorial election
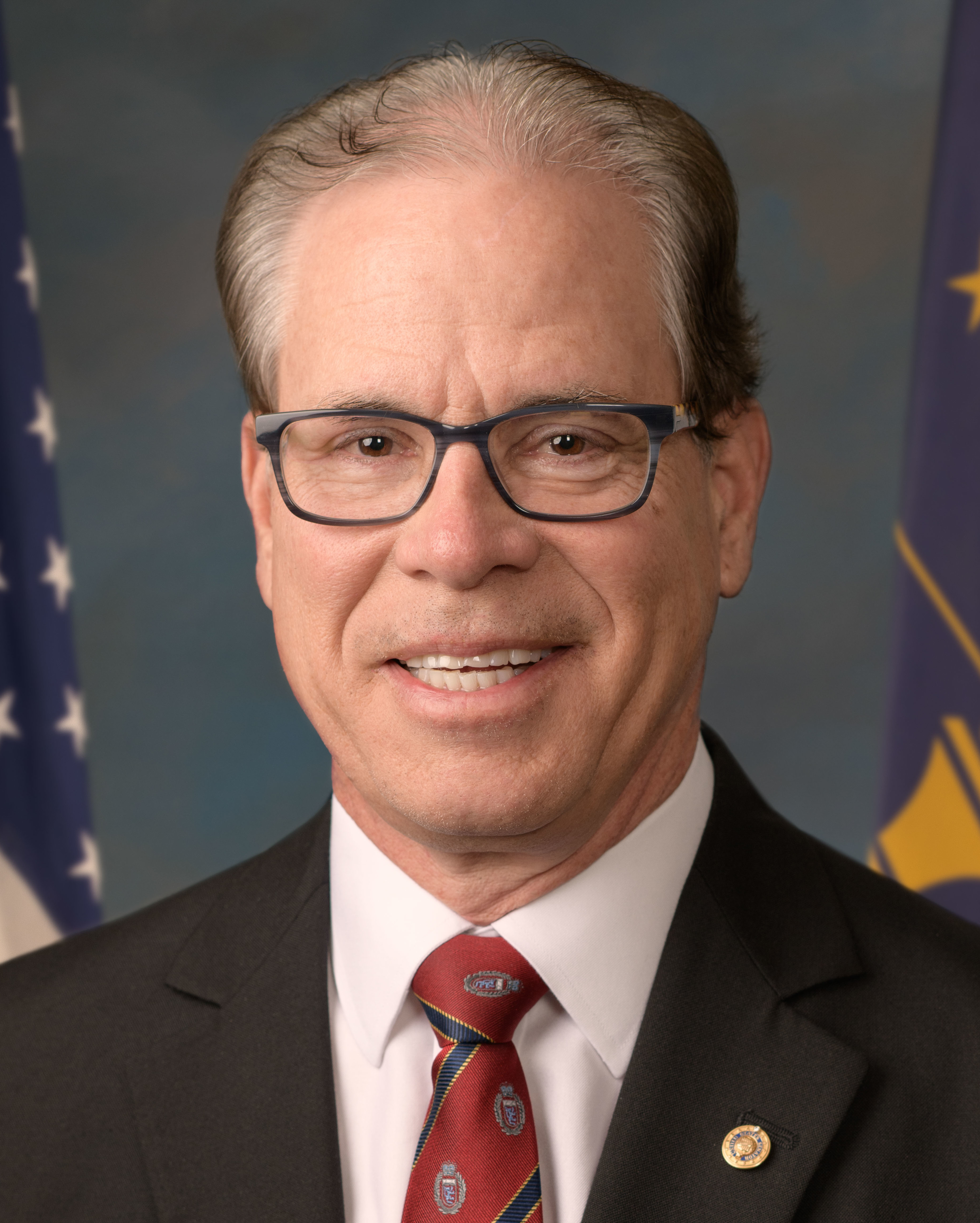

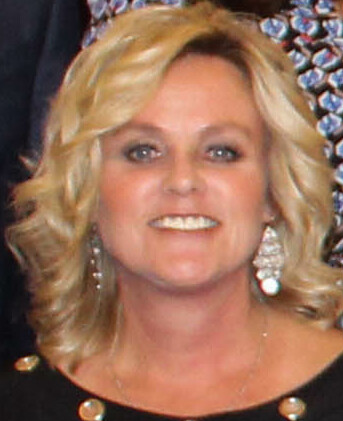
Nominee	Mike Braun	Jennifer McCormick
Party	Republican	Democratic
Running mate	Micah Beckwith	Terry Goodin
Popular vote	1,561,279	1,179,967
Percentage	54.38%	41.11%
- County results Braun: 40–50% 50–60% 60–70% 70–80% McCormick: 40–50% 50–60% 60–70%
Governor before election
Eric Holcomb
Republican
Elected Governor
Mike Braun
Republican

Governor Eric Holcomb, who was re-elected in the 2020 with 57% of the vote, was term-limited by the Indiana Constitution in 2024 and could not seek re-election for a third consecutive term. U.S. Senator Mike Braun has won the Republican nomination, defeating Lieutenant Governor Suzanne Crouch, former president of the Indiana Economic Development Corporation Eric Doden and former Attorney General Curtis Hill.

Former Republican state Superintendent of Schools Jennifer McCormick won the Democratic nomination, previously switching parties in 2021. Braun won the election.

Republican primary results
Party	Candidate	Votes	%
Republican	Mike Braun	236,641	39.6
Republican	Suzanne Crouch	130,146	21.8
Republican	Brad Chambers	104,653	17.5
Republican	Eric Doden	71,135	11.9
Republican	Jamie Reitenour	28,757	4.8
Republican	Curtis Hill	26,837	4.5
Total votes		598,169	100.0

Democratic primary results
Party	Candidate	Votes	%
Democratic	Jennifer McCormick	180,404	100.00%
Total votes		180,404	100.00%

2024 Indiana gubernatorial election
Party	Candidate	Votes	%	±%
Republican	Mike Braun Micah Beckwith	1,566,081	54.38	−2.13
Democratic	Jennifer McCormick Terry Goodin	1,183,741	41.11	+9.06
Libertarian	Donald Rainwater Tonya Hudson	129,781	4.52	−6.92
Total votes		2,879,603	100.00	
Republican hold				

== Missouri ==
Missouri gubernatorial election
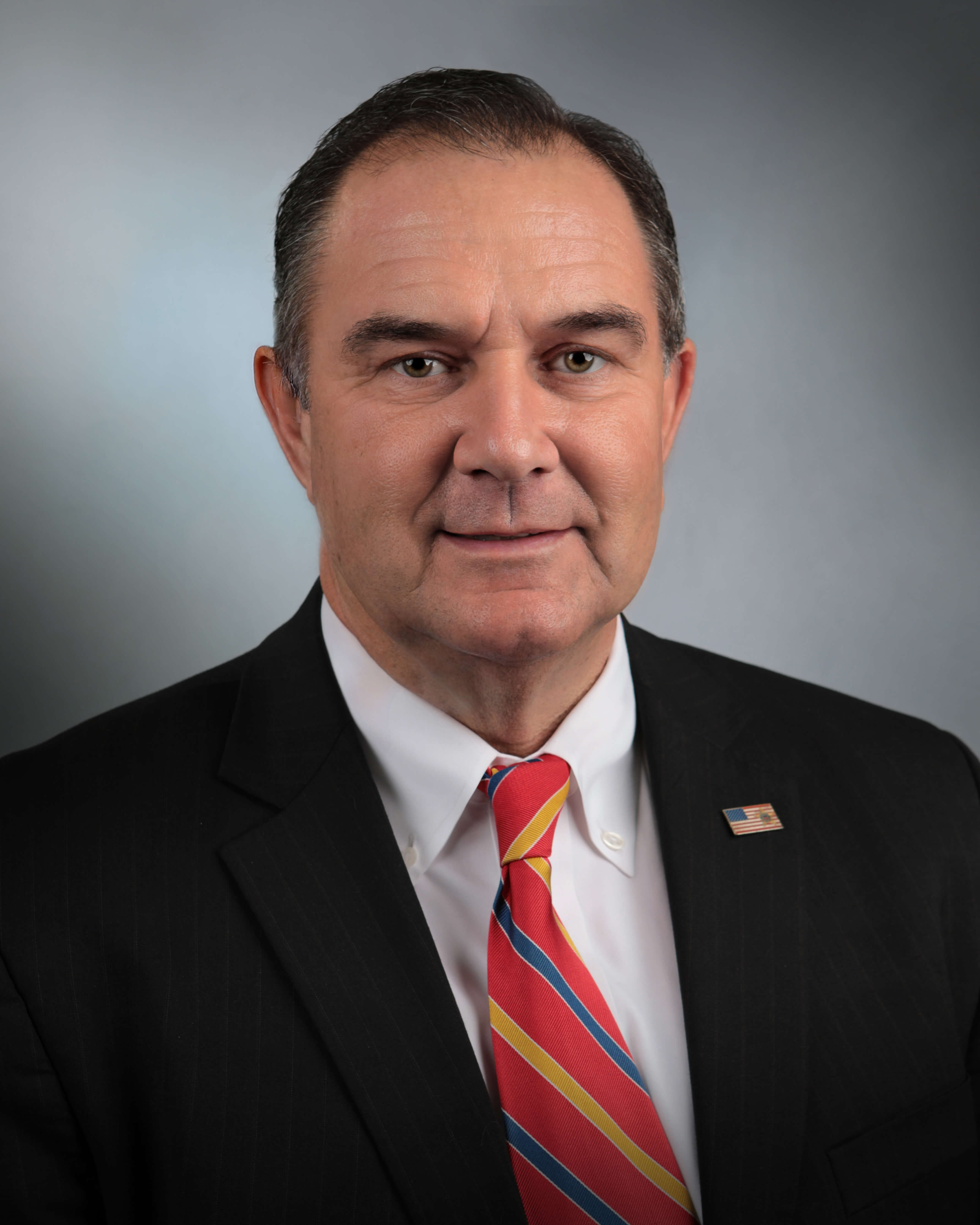

Nominee	Mike Kehoe	Crystal Quade
Party	Republican	Democratic
Popular vote	1,746,317	1,141,152
Percentage	59.12%	38.68%
- County results Kehoe: 50–60% 60–70% 70–80% 80–90% Quade: 50–60% 70–80%
Governor before election
Mike Parson
Republican
Elected Governor
Mike Kehoe
Republican

Governor Mike Parson took office on June 1, 2018, upon the resignation of Eric Greitens and was elected to a full term in his own right in 2020 with 57.2% of the vote. Because Parson served more than two years of Greitens' term, he was term-limited by the Missouri Constitution in 2024 and could not seek re-election for a second full term. Incumbent Lieutenant Governor Mike Kehoe won the Republican gubernatorial nomination with 39% of the vote, defeating state Senator Bill Eigel and Secretary of State Jay Ashcroft. In the Democratic primary, state House Minority Leader Crystal Quade won the nomination.

Republican primary results
Party	Candidate	Votes	%
Republican	Mike Kehoe	274,840	39.4
Republican	Bill Eigel	227,012	32.6
Republican	Jay Ashcroft	162,086	23.2
Republican	Amber Thomsen	10,627	1.5
Republican	Chris Wright	9,358	1.3
Republican	Darrell McClanahan	5,637	0.8
Republican	Robert Olson	2,975	0.4
Republican	Jeremy Gundel	2,946	0.4
Republican	Darren Grant	1,866	0.3
Total votes		697,347	100.0

Democratic primary results
Party	Candidate	Votes	%
Democratic	Crystal Quade	189,822	50.2
Democratic	Mike Hamra	119,702	31.7
Democratic	Eric Morrison	36,985	9.8
Democratic	Sheryl Gladney	25,287	6.7
Democratic	Hollis Laster	5,973	1.6
Total votes		377,769	100.0

2024 Missouri gubernatorial election
Party	Candidate	Votes	%	±%
Republican	Mike Kehoe	1,750,802	59.14%	▲2.03%
Democratic	Crystal Quade	1,146,173	38.72%	▼1.97%
Libertarian	Bill Slantz	40,908	1.38%	▼0.25%
Green	Paul Lehmann	22,359	0.76%	▲0.19%
Write-in		24	0.00%	Steady
Total votes		2,960,266	100.00%	N/A
Republican hold				

== Montana ==
Montana gubernatorial election
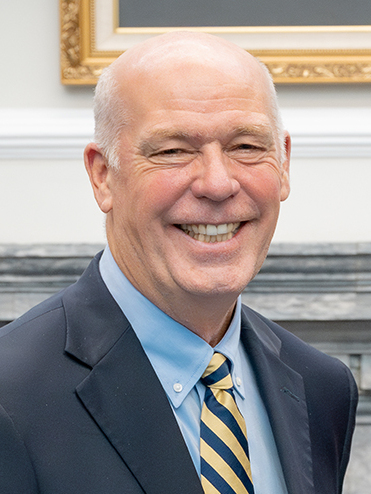

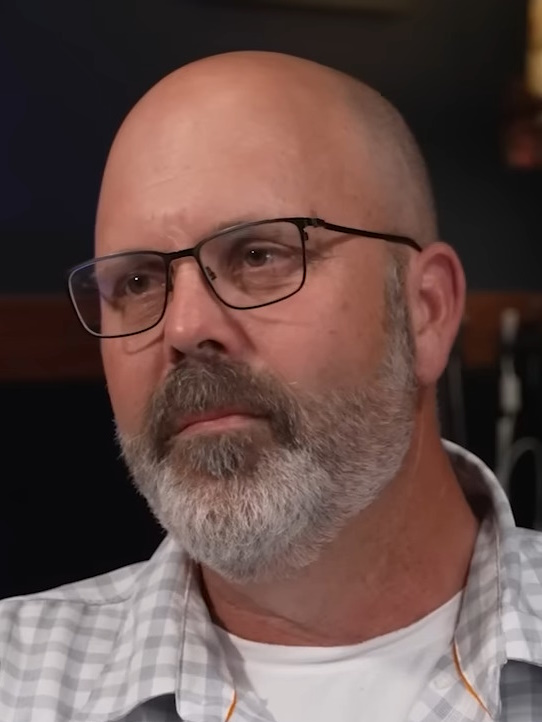
Nominee	Greg Gianforte	Ryan Busse
Party	Republican	Democratic
Running mate	Kristen Juras	Raph Graybill
Popular vote	354,448	232,547
Percentage	58.86%	38.62%
- County results Gianforte: 40–50% 50–60% 60–70% 70–80% 80–90% 90-100% Busse: 50–60%
Governor before election
Greg Gianforte
Republican
Elected Governor
Greg Gianforte
Republican

Governor Greg Gianforte was elected in 2020 with 54.4% of the vote. He ran for re-election and defeated State Representative Tanner Smith in the primary.

Businessman Ryan Busse won the Democratic nomination and faced Gianforte in the general election. Gianforte prevailed.

Republican primary results
Party	Candidate	Votes	%
Republican	Greg Gianforte (incumbent) Kristen Juras (incumbent)	144,752	75.2%
Republican	Tanner Smith Randy Pinocci	47,747	24.8%
Total votes		192,499	100.0%

Democratic primary results
Party	Candidate	Votes	%
Democratic	Ryan Busse Raph Graybill	69,184	70.9%
Democratic	Jim Hunt Jerry Driscoll	28,354	29.1%
Total votes		97,538	100.00%

2024 Montana gubernatorial election
Party	Candidate	Votes	%	±%
Republican	Greg Gianforte (incumbent); Kristen Juras (incumbent)	354,569	58.86%	+4.43%
Democratic	Ryan Busse; Raph Graybill	232,644	38.62%	−2.94%
Libertarian	Kaiser Leib; Matt Campbell	15,191	2.52%	−1.49%
Total votes		602,404	100.00%	N/A
Turnout		612,423	76.57%	
Registered electors		799,849		
Republican hold				

== New Hampshire ==
New Hampshire gubernatorial election
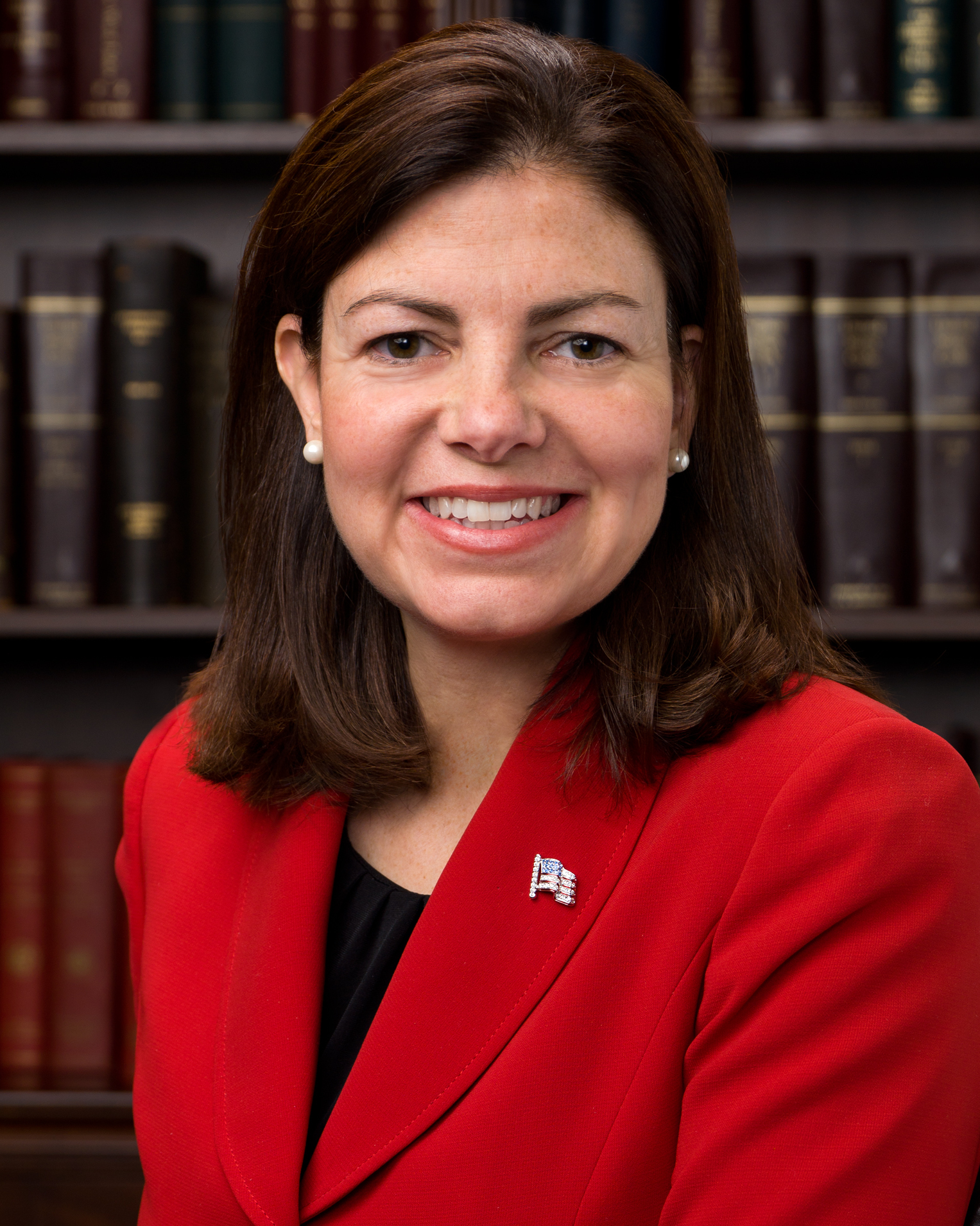

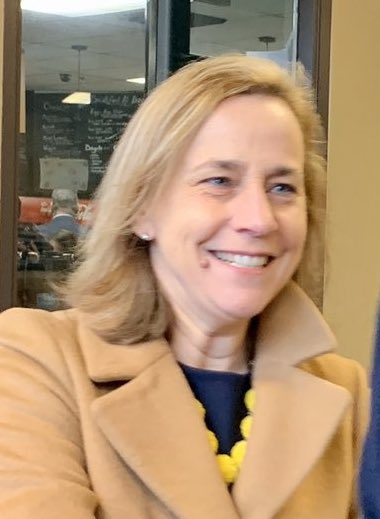
Nominee	Kelly Ayotte	Joyce Craig
Party	Republican	Democratic
Popular vote	435,400	360,068
Percentage	53.61%	44.27%
- Ayotte: 40–50% 50–60% 60–70% 70–80% 80–90% Craig: 40–50% 50–60% 60–70% 70–80% >90%
Governor before election
Chris Sununu
Republican
Elected Governor
Kelly Ayotte
Republican

Governor Chris Sununu won re-election to a fourth term in 2022. However, on July 19, 2023, he announced he would not seek re-election. Former U.S. Senator Kelly Ayotte won the Republican gubernatorial nomination, defeating former state Senator Chuck Morse.

In the Democratic primary former Manchester Mayor Joyce Craig defeated state Executive Councilor Cinde Warmington for the Democratic nomination.

Republican primary results
Party	Candidate	Votes	%
Republican	Kelly Ayotte	88,117	63.12%
Republican	Chuck Morse	47,567	34.07%
Republican	Shaun Fife	876	0.63%
Write-in		867	0.62%
Republican	Robert McClory	839	0.60%
Republican	Frank Staples	809	0.58%
Republican	Richard McMenamon	527	0.38%
Total votes		139,602	100.00%

Democratic primary results
Party	Candidate	Votes	%
Democratic	Joyce Craig	59,976	47.88%
Democratic	Cinde Warmington	52,420	41.85%
Democratic	Jon Kiper	11,789	9.41%
Write-in		1,076	0.86%
Total votes		125,261	100.00%

2024 New Hampshire gubernatorial election
Party	Candidate	Votes	%	±%
Republican	Kelly Ayotte	436,122	53.61%	−3.37%
Democratic	Joyce Craig	360,149	44.27%	+2.80%
Libertarian	Stephen Villee	16,202	1.99%	N/A
Write-in		1,024	0.13%	-0.15%
Total votes		813,497	100.00%	N/A
Turnout		832,518		
Registered electors				
Republican hold				

== North Carolina ==
2024 North Carolina gubernatorial election
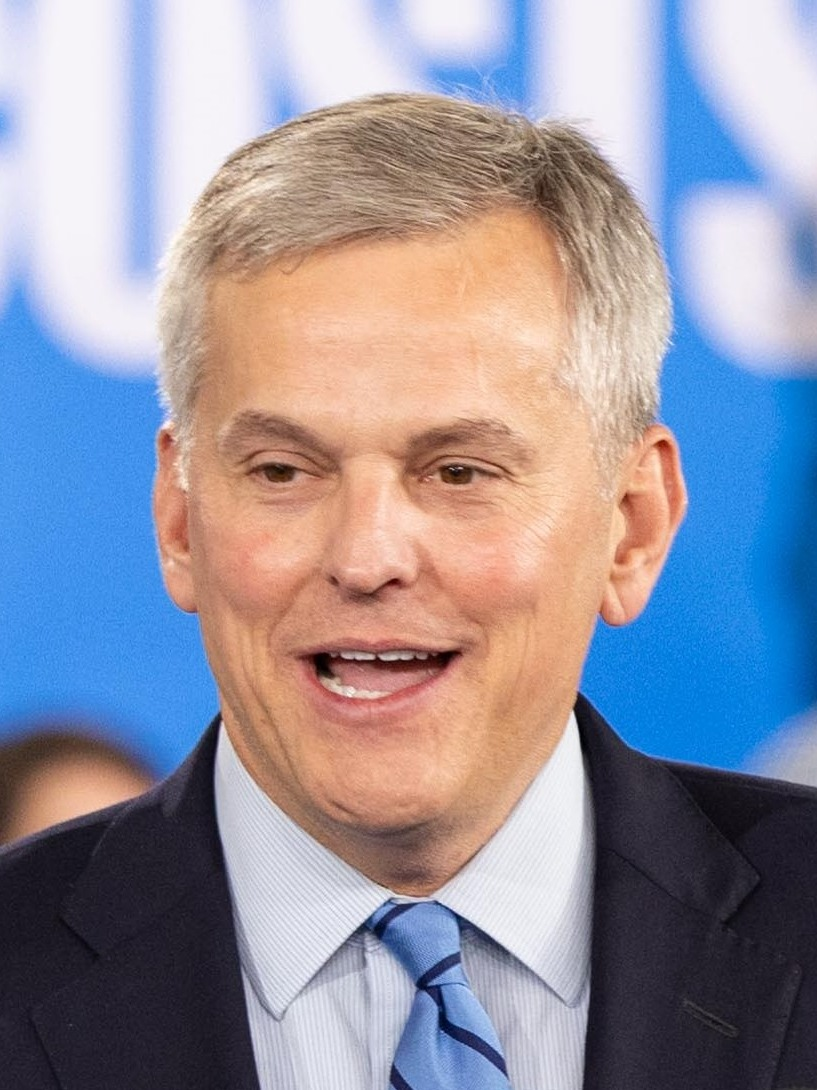

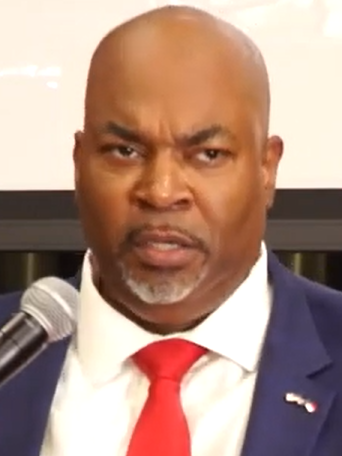
Nominee	Josh Stein	Mark Robinson
Party	Democratic	Republican
Popular vote	3,069,496	2,241,309
Percentage	54.90%	40.08%
- County results Stein: 40–50% 50–60% 60–70% 70–80% 80–90% Robinson: 40–50% 50–60% 60–70% 70–80%
Governor before election
Roy Cooper
Democratic
Elected Governor
Josh Stein
Democratic

Governor Roy Cooper was re-elected to a second term in 2020 with 51.5% of the vote. He was term-limited by the North Carolina Constitution in 2024 and could not seek re-election for a third consecutive term. Attorney General Josh Stein defeated former state Supreme Court justice Michael Morgan for the Democratic gubernatorial nomination, while Lieutenant Governor Mark Robinson defeated State Treasurer Dale Folwell for the Republican gubernatorial nomination.

Stein won the election with the largest percent of the vote since 2004 and the largest margin of victory since 1980.

Democratic primary results
Party	Candidate	Votes	%
Democratic	Josh Stein	479,026	69.60%
Democratic	Michael R. Morgan	98,627	14.33%
Democratic	Chrelle Booker	46,045	6.69%
Democratic	Marcus Williams	39,257	5.70%
Democratic	Gary Foxx	25,283	3.67%
Total votes		688,238	100.0%

Republican primary results
Party	Candidate	Votes	%
Republican	Mark Robinson	666,504	64.83%
Republican	Dale Folwell	196,955	19.16%
Republican	Bill Graham	164,572	16.01%
Total votes		1,028,031	100.0%

2024 North Carolina gubernatorial election
Party	Candidate	Votes	%	±%
Democratic	Josh Stein	3,069,496	54.90%	+3.38%
Republican	Mark Robinson	2,241,309	40.08%	–6.93%
Libertarian	Mike Ross	176,392	3.15%	+2.05%
Constitution	Vinny Smith	54,738	0.98%	+0.60%
Green	Wayne Turner	49,612	0.89%	N/A
Total votes		5,591,547	100.0%	
Democratic hold				

== North Dakota ==
North Dakota gubernatorial election
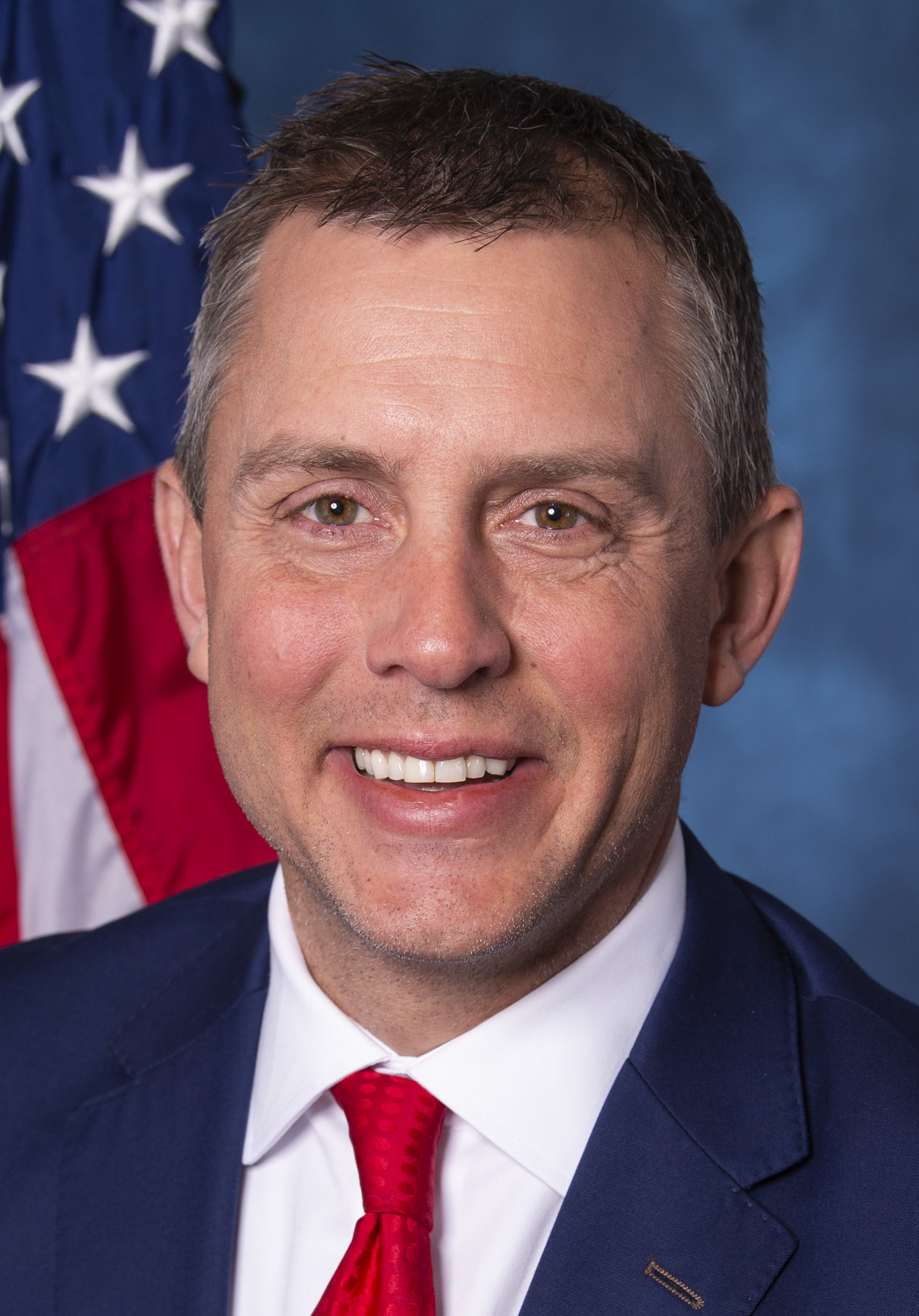

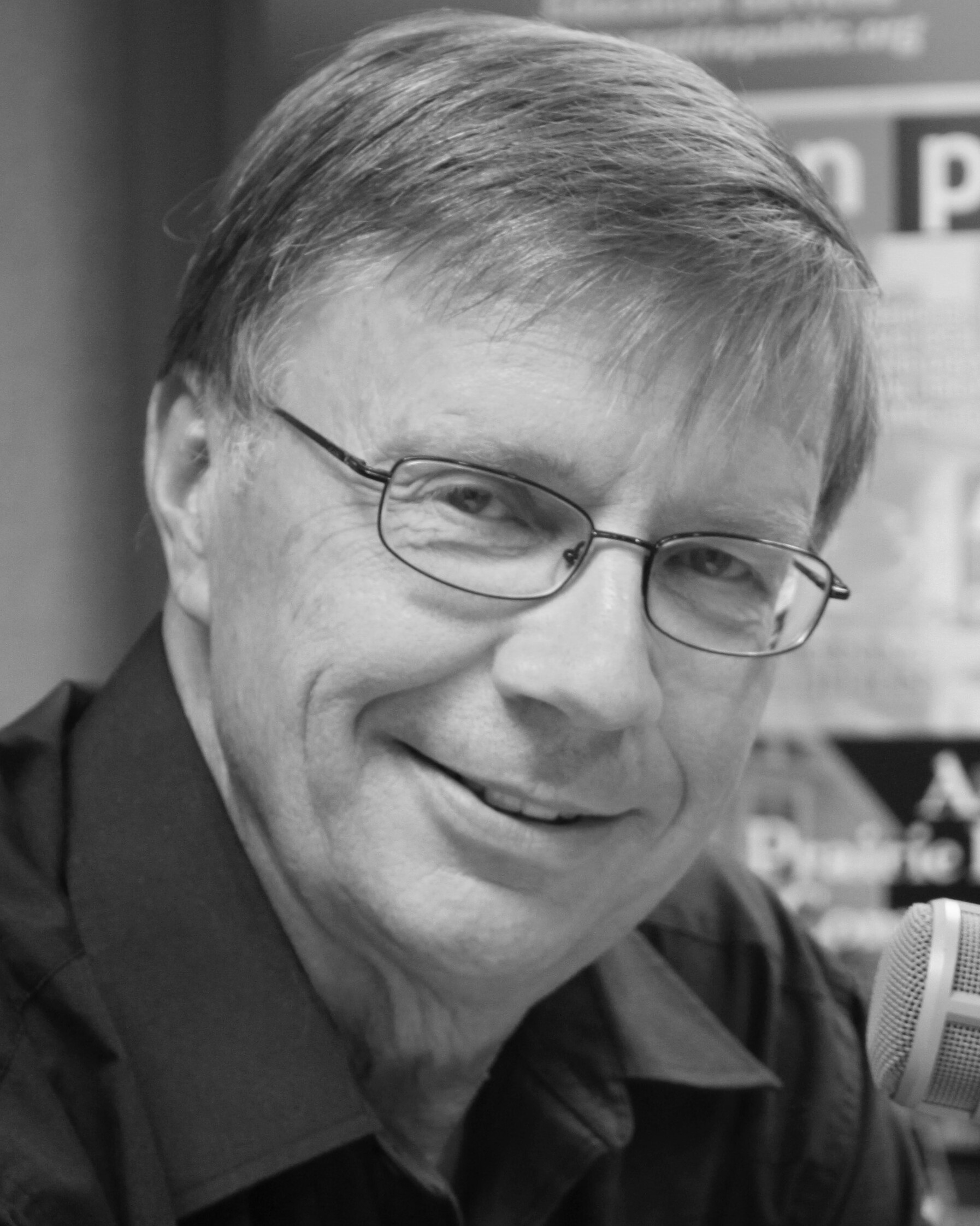

Nominee	Kelly Armstrong	Merrill Piepkorn	Michael Coachman
Party	Republican	Democratic–NPL	Independent
Running mate	Michelle Strinden	Patrick Hart	Lydia Gessele
Popular vote	247,056	94,043	20,322
Percentage	68.26%	25.98%	5.61%
- County results Armstrong: 50–60% 60–70% 70–80% 80–90% Piepkorn: 50–60%
Governor before election
Doug Burgum
Republican
Elected Governor
Kelly Armstrong
Republican

Governor Doug Burgum was re-elected to a second term in 2020 with 65.8% of the vote. In the November 2022 elections, voters amended the North Dakota Constitution to place a limit of two, four-year terms for succeeding governors sworn into office after the amendment's effective date of January 1, 2023. Burgum, sworn into office before the amendment's effective date, remained eligible to run for re-election for a third term. Burgum initially ran for the Republican nomination in the 2024 United States presidential election, but dropped out before the primaries. On January 22, 2024, he announced he would not seek re-election as Governor. United States Representative Kelly Armstrong won the Republican nomination and defeated Lieutenant Governor Tammy Miller.

On the other side, state Senator Merrill Piepkorn won the Democratic nomination unopposed.

Republican primary results
Party	Candidate	Votes	%
Republican	Kelly Armstrong Michelle Strinden	67,704	73.2%
Republican	Tammy Miller Josh Teigen	24,784	26.8%
Total votes		92,488	100.0%

Democratic–NPL primary results
Party	Candidate	Votes	%
Democratic–NPL	Merrill Piepkorn Patrick Hart	19,609	100.0%
Total votes		19,609	100.0%

2024 North Dakota gubernatorial election
Party	Candidate	Votes	%	±%
Republican	Kelly Armstrong Michelle Strinden	247,056	68.26%	+2.42%
Democratic–NPL	Merrill Piepkorn Patrick Hart	94,043	25.98%	+0.60%
Independent	Michael Coachman Lydia Gessele	20,322	5.61%	N/A
Write-in		530	0.15%	-4.75%
Total votes		361,951	100.00%	N/A
Republican hold				

== Utah ==
Utah gubernatorial election
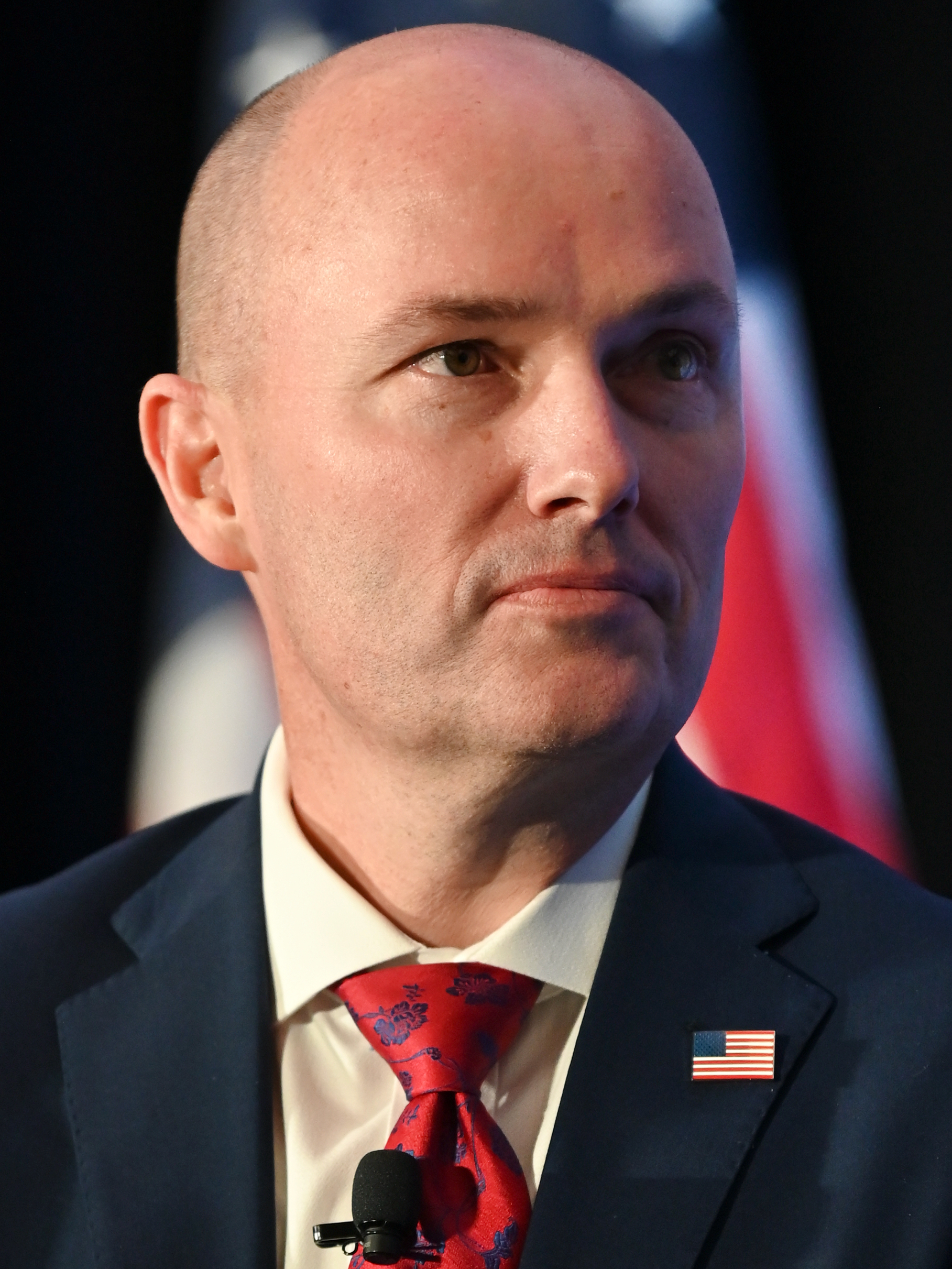

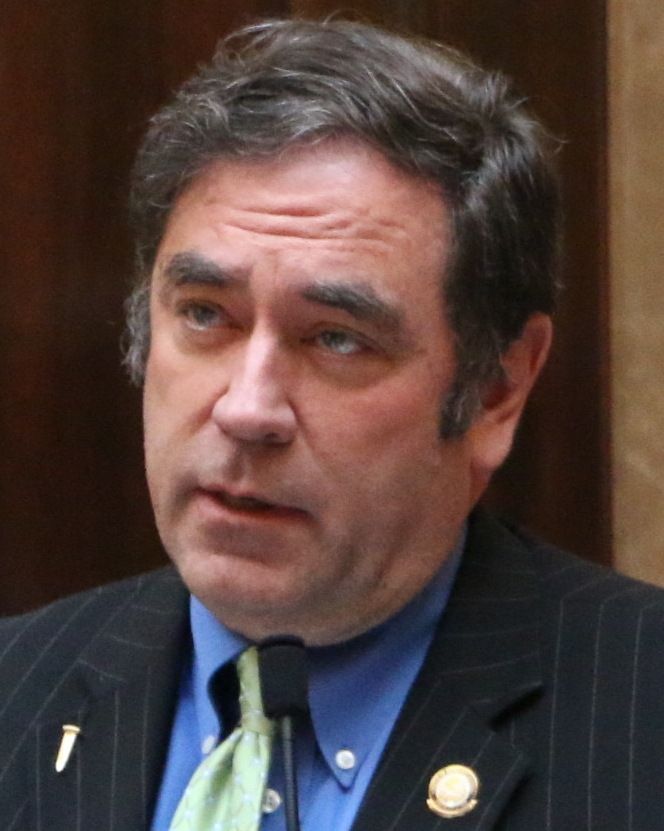

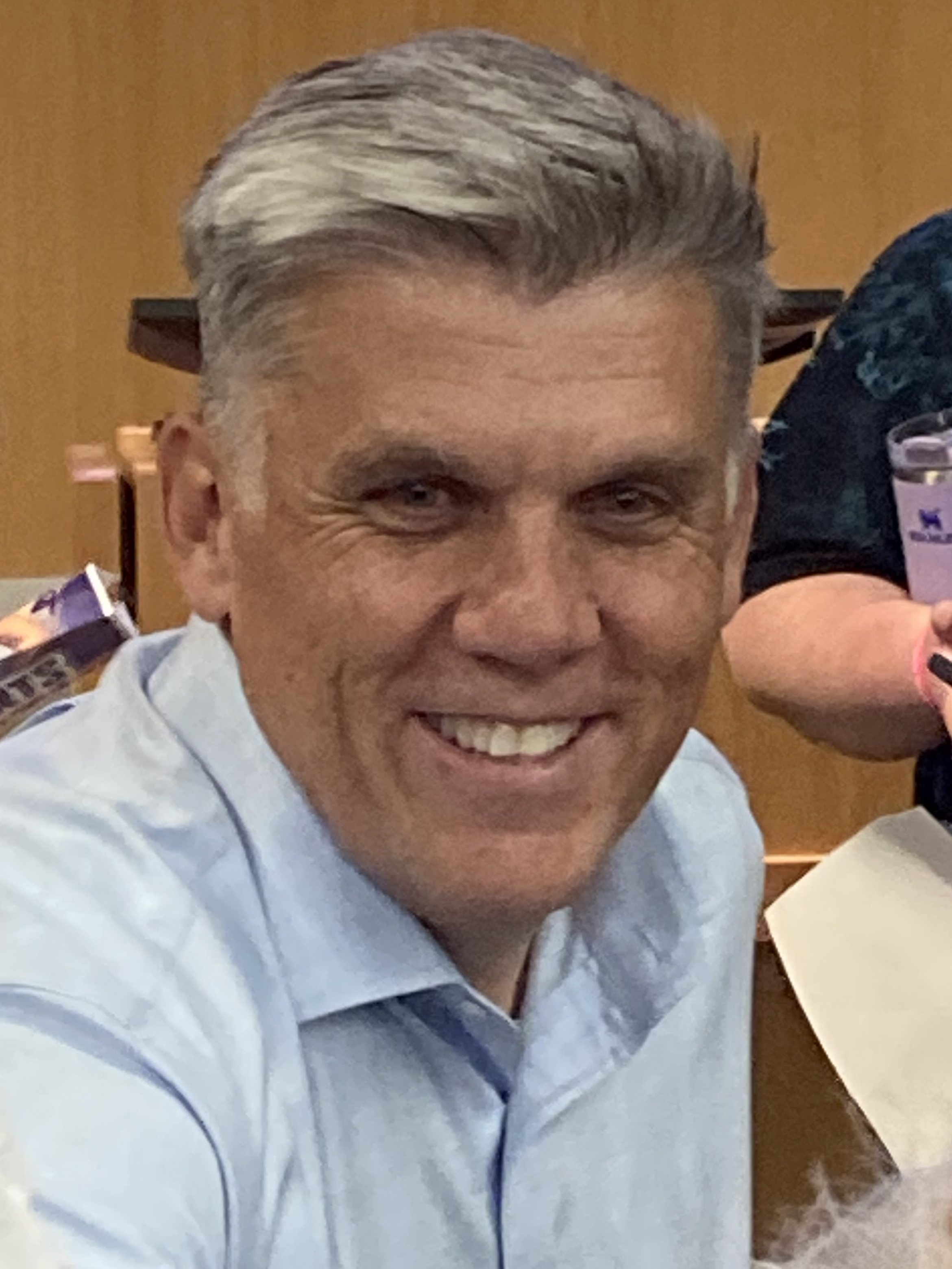
Nominee	Spencer Cox	Brian King	Phil Lyman (write-in)
Party	Republican	Democratic	Independent Republican
Running mate	Deidre Henderson	Rebekah Cummings	Natalie Clawson
Popular vote	781,431	420,513	200,551
Percentage	52.89%	28.46%	13.57%
- County results Cox: 30–40% 40–50% 50–60% 60–70% 70–80% King: 40–50%
Governor before election
Spencer Cox
Republican
Elected Governor
Spencer Cox
Republican

Governor Spencer Cox was elected in 2020 with 63% of the vote and ran for re-election to a second term. He won the Republican primary over conservative state Representative Phil Lyman to be the nominee.

On the other side, state Representative Brian King won the Democratic nomination unopposed.

Republican primary results
Party	Candidate	Votes	%
Republican	Spencer Cox (incumbent) Deidre Henderson (incumbent)	232,164	54.40%
Republican	Phil Lyman Natalie Clawson	194,639	45.60%
Total votes		426,803	100.00%

2024 Utah gubernatorial election
Party	Candidate	Votes	%	±%
Republican	Spencer Cox (incumbent); Deidre Henderson (incumbent)	781,431	52.89%	−10.09
Democratic	Brian King; Rebekah Cummings	420,514	28.63%	−1.72
Write-In	Phil Lyman; Natalie Clawson	200,551	13.57%	N/A
Libertarian	J. Robert Latham; Barry Evan Short	41,164	2.79%	−0.73
Independent American	Tommy Williams; Archie Williams	27,480	1.86%	+0.09
Independent	Tom Tomeny; William Lansing Taylor	5,792	0.39%	N/A
Write-In	Charlie Tautuaa; Sylvia Miera Fisk	525	0.04%	N/A
Total votes		1,477,457	100.00%	
Republican hold				

== Vermont ==
Vermont gubernatorial election
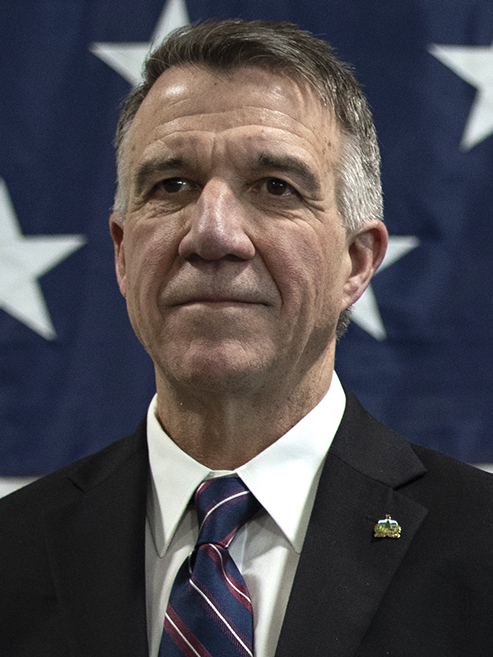

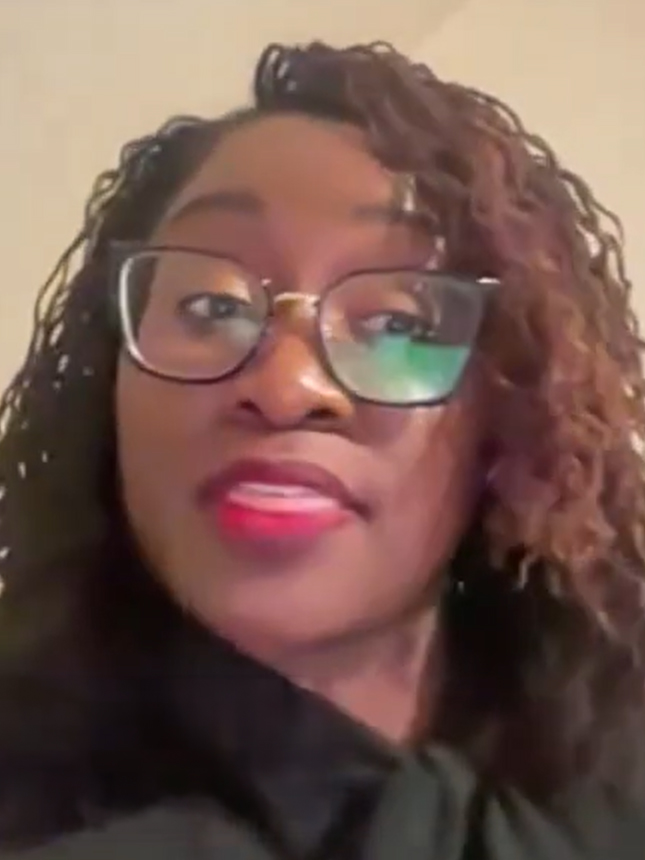
Nominee	Phil Scott	Esther Charlestin
Party	Republican	Democratic
Popular vote	266,434	79,220
Percentage	73.44%	21.83%
- Scott: 40–50% 50–60% 60–70% 70–80% 80–90% 90-100% No Data/Vote
Governor before election
Phil Scott
Republican
Elected Governor
Phil Scott
Republican

Governor Phil Scott won re-election to a fourth two-year term in 2022.

Republican primary results
Party	Candidate	Votes	%
Republican	Phil Scott (incumbent)	23,173	92.75%
Republican	Undervotes (Note: Blank ballots)	1,357	5.43%
Write-in		448	1.79%
Republican	Overvotes	7	0.03%
Total votes		23,565	100.00%

Democratic primary results
Party	Candidate	Votes	%
Democratic	Esther Charlestin	24,007	46.19%
Democratic	Undervotes	13,404	25.79%
Democratic	Peter Duval	9,377	18.04%
Republican	Phil Scott (write-in)	4,558	8.77%
Write-in	Misc. Write-ins	601	1.56%
Democratic	Overvotes	22	0.04%
Total votes		51,969	100%

Progressive primary results
Party	Candidate	Votes	%
Progressive	Marielle Blais	268	64.73%
Progressive	Undervotes	71	17.11%
Republican	Phil Scott (write-in)	35	8.45%
Democratic	Esther Charlestin (write-in)	21	5.07%
Write-in	Misc. Write-ins	19	4.59%
Total votes		414	100%

2024 Vermont gubernatorial election
Party	Candidate	Votes	%	±%
Republican	Phil Scott (incumbent)	266,439	73.43%	+2.52%
Democratic/Progressive	Esther Charlestin	79,217	21.83%	−2.11%
Independent	Kevin Hoyt	9,368	2.58%	+0.52%
Green Mountain Peace and Justice	June Goodband	4,512	1.24%	N/A
Independent	Eli "Poa" Mutino	2,414	0.67%	N/A
Write-in		891	0.25%	−0.21
Total votes		362,841	100.0%	
Republican hold				

== Washington ==
Washington gubernatorial election
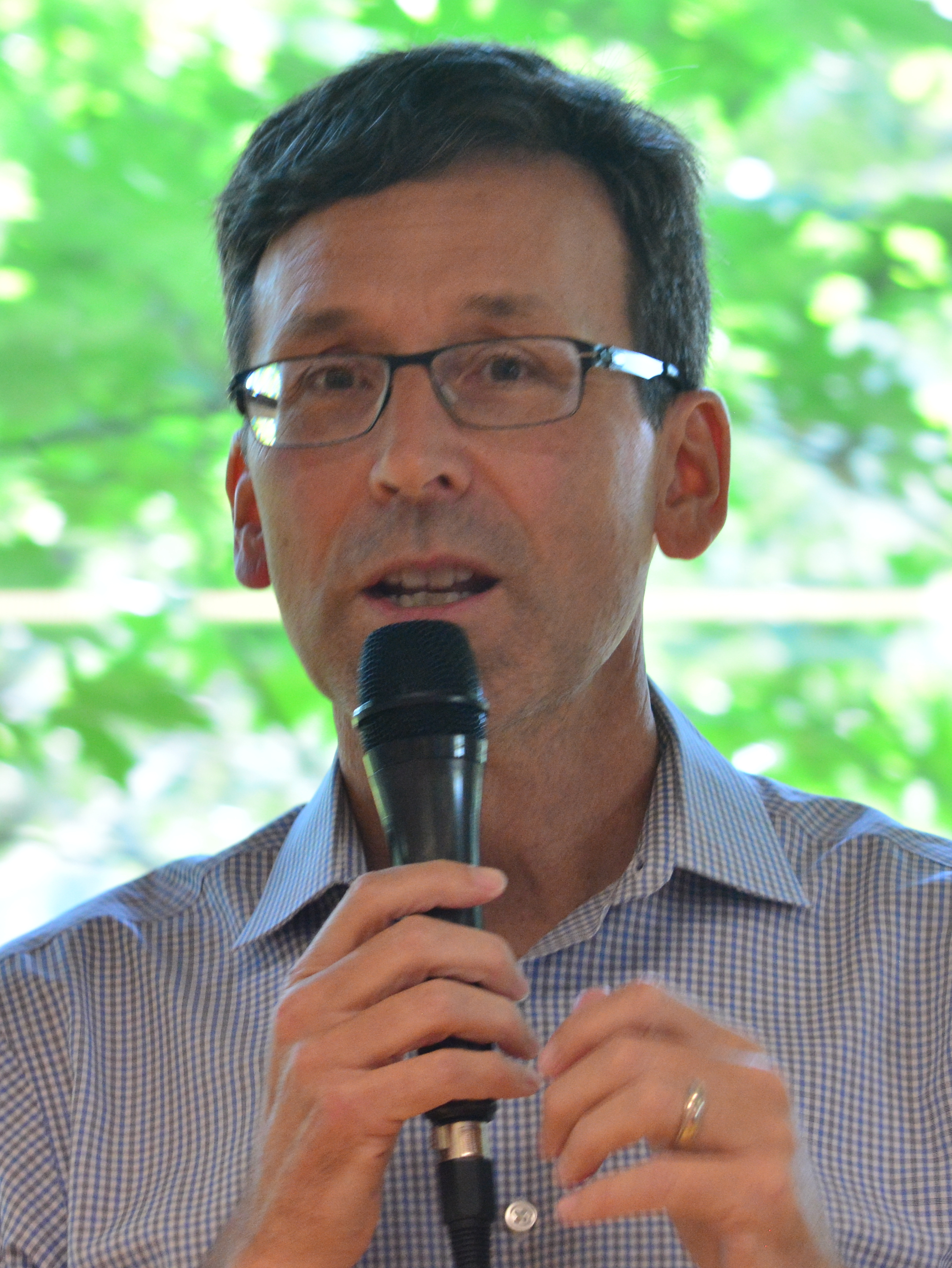

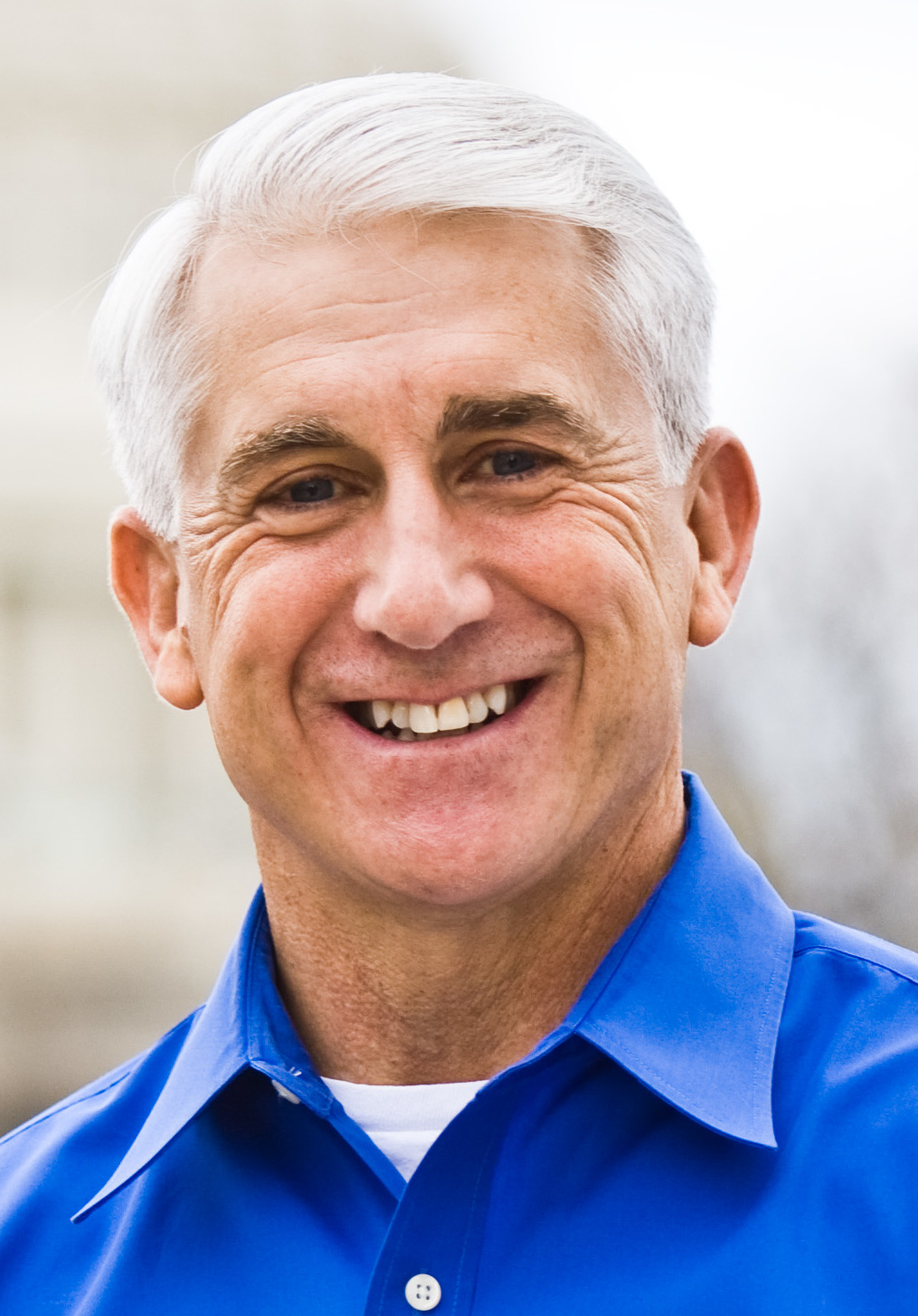
Candidate	Bob Ferguson	Dave Reichert
Party	Democratic	Republican
Popular vote	2,126,855	1,692,814
Percentage	55.51%	44.28%
- County results Ferguson: 50–60% 70–80% Reichert: 50–60% 60–70% 70–80%
Governor before election
Jay Inslee
Democratic
Elected Governor
Bob Ferguson
Democratic

Washington Governor Jay Inslee was re-elected to a third term in 2020 with 56.6% of the vote. Because Washington does not have gubernatorial term limits in its constitution, he was eligible to run for re-election for a fourth term, but he has decided not to seek re-election. State Attorney General Bob Ferguson won the Democratic nomination. In the Republican primary, former U.S. representative Dave Reichert won the nomination.

Blanket primary results
Party	Candidate	Votes	%
Democratic	Bob Ferguson	884,268	44.88%
Republican	Dave Reichert	541,533	27.48%
Republican	Semi Bird	212,692	10.79%
Democratic	Mark Mullet	119,048	6.04%
Trump Republican (Note: Not an actual political party. In Washington, independent candidates are allowed to choose a ballot label)	Leon Lawson	35,971	1.83%
Republican	Jim Daniel	29,907	1.52%
Democratic	Cassondra Hanson	24,512	1.24%
Democratic	EL'ona Kearney	24,374	1.24%
Republican	Jennifer Hoover	15,692	0.80%
Green	Andre Stackhouse	11,962	0.61%
Democratic	Don Rivers	9,453	0.48%
Republican	Martin Wheeler	7,676	0.39%
Democratic	Chaytan Inman	6,427	0.33%
Democratic	Ricky Anthony	6,226	0.32%
Independent	Jeff Curry	6,068	0.31%
Democratic	Fred Grant	5,503	0.28%
Independent	Brian Bogen	4,530	0.23%
Republican	A.L. Brown	4,232	0.21%
Libertarian	Michael DePaula	3,957	0.20%
Independence	Rosetta Marshall-Williams	2,960	0.15%
Independent	Jim Clark	2,355	0.12%
Democratic	Edward Cale	1,975	0.10%
Standup-America	Alex Tsimerman	1,721	0.09%
Republican	Bill Hirt	1,720	0.09%
Write-in		1,347	0.07%
Independent	Frank Dare	1,115	0.06%
Nonsense Busters	Alan Makayev	1,106	0.06%
Independent	William Combs	1,042	0.05%
Independent	Brad Mjelde	991	0.05%
Total votes		1,970,363	100.0%

2024 Washington gubernatorial election
Party	Candidate	Votes	%	±%
Democratic	Bob Ferguson	2,143,368	55.51%	−1.05%
Republican	Dave Reichert	1,709,818	44.28%	+1.16%
Write-in		8,202	0.21%	-0.11%
Total votes		3,861,388	100.00%	N/A
Democratic hold				

== West Virginia ==
West Virginia gubernatorial election
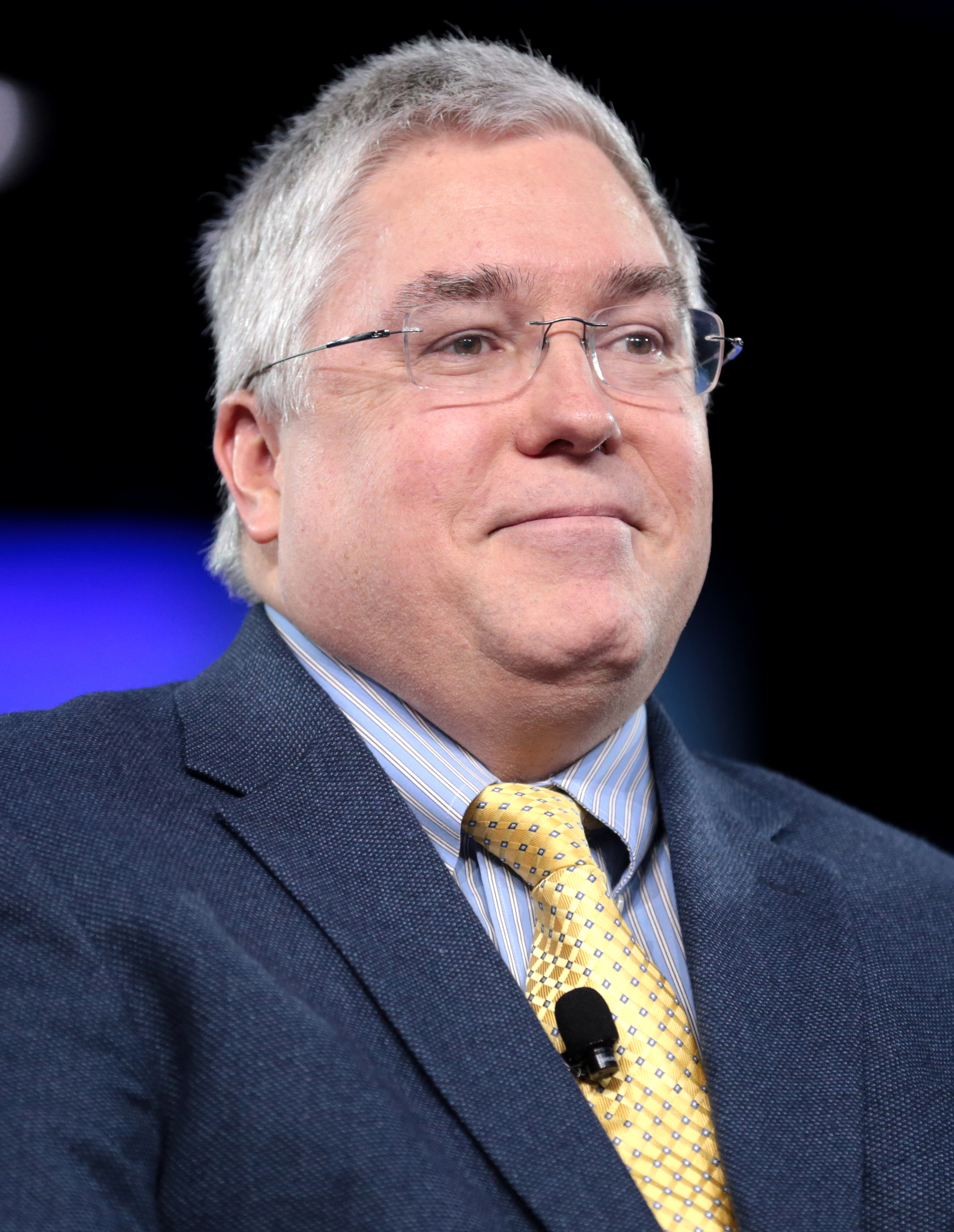

Nominee	Patrick Morrisey	Steve Williams
Party	Republican	Democratic
Popular vote	459,300	233,976
Percentage	61.99%	31.58%
- County results Morrisey: 40–50% 50–60% 60–70%
Governor before election
Jim Justice
Republican
Elected Governor
Patrick Morrisey
Republican

Governor Jim Justice was re-elected to a second term in 2020 with 63.5% of the vote. He was term-limited by the West Virginia Constitution in 2024 and ineligible to seek re-election for a third consecutive term. Justice won the 2024 United States Senate election in West Virginia and succeeded Joe Manchin.

State Attorney General Patrick Morrisey won the Republican nomination, defeating former state Delegate Moore Capito, businessman Chris Miller, and Secretary of State Mac Warner.

Huntington Mayor Steve Williams won the Democratic nomination unopposed.

Morrisey won the election in a landslide by over 30 points and managed to carry every single county.

Republican primary results
Party	Candidate	Votes	%
Republican	Patrick Morrisey	75,111	33.28%
Republican	Moore Capito	62,181	27.55%
Republican	Chris Miller	46,010	20.39%
Republican	Mac Warner	36,170	16.03%
Republican	Mitch Roberts	3,138	1.39%
Republican	Kevin Christian	3,088	1.37%
Total votes		225,698	100.00%

Democratic primary results
Party	Candidate	Votes	%
Democratic	Steve Williams	89,545	100.00%
Total votes		89,545	100.00%

2024 West Virginia gubernatorial election
Party	Candidate	Votes	%	±%
Republican	Patrick Morrisey	459,300	61.99%	▼1.50%
Democratic	Steve Williams	233,976	31.58%	▲1.36%
Libertarian	Erika Kolenich	21,228	2.87%	Steady
Constitution	S. Marshall Wilson	16,828	2.27%	N/A
Mountain	Chase Linko-Looper	9,596	1.30%	▼0.14%
Write-in		10	0.00%	▼0.05%
Total votes		740,938	100.00%	N/A
Republican hold				

== Territories ==
=== American Samoa ===
2024 American Samoa gubernatorial election
- November 5, 2024 (first round); November 19, 2024 (runoff)
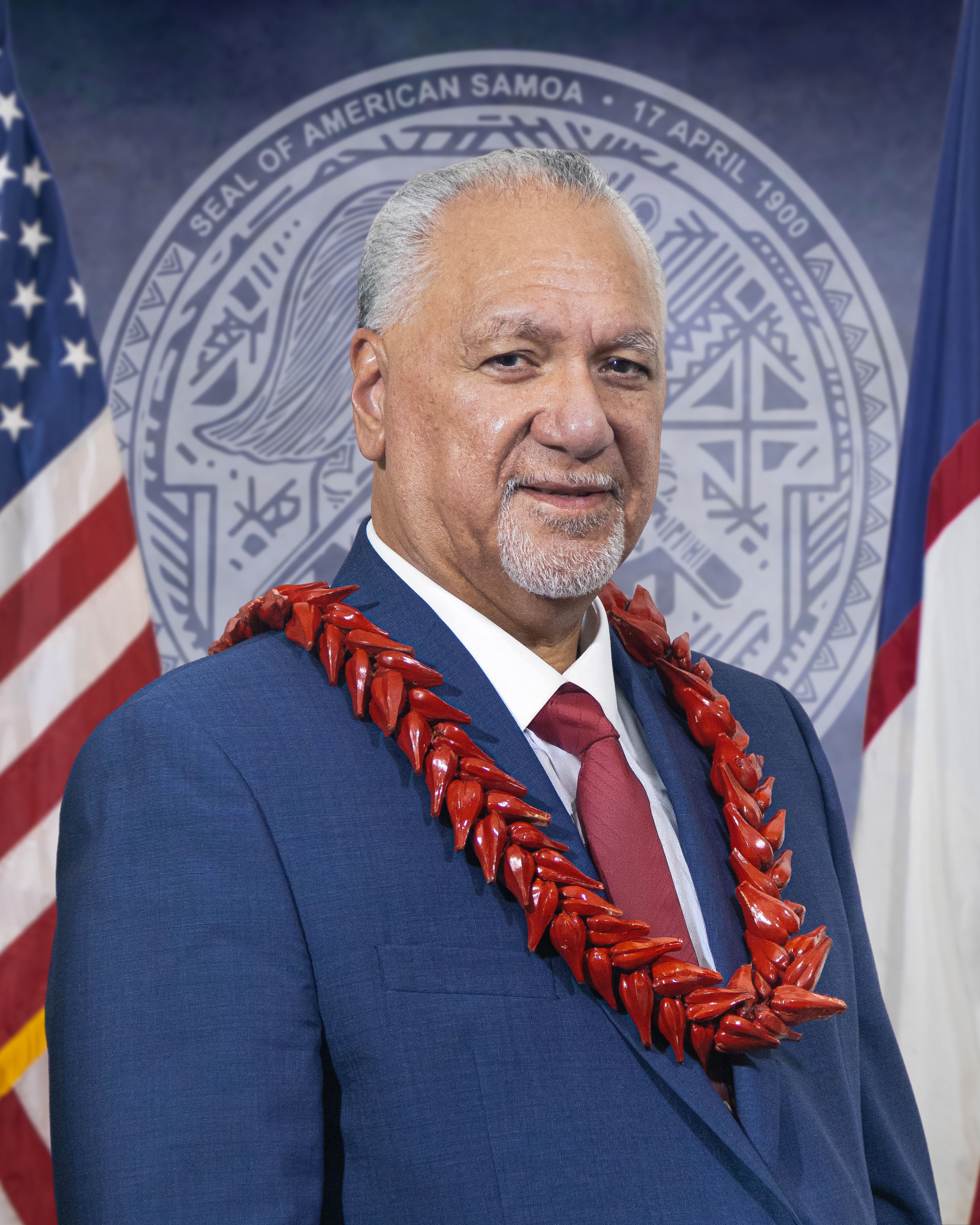

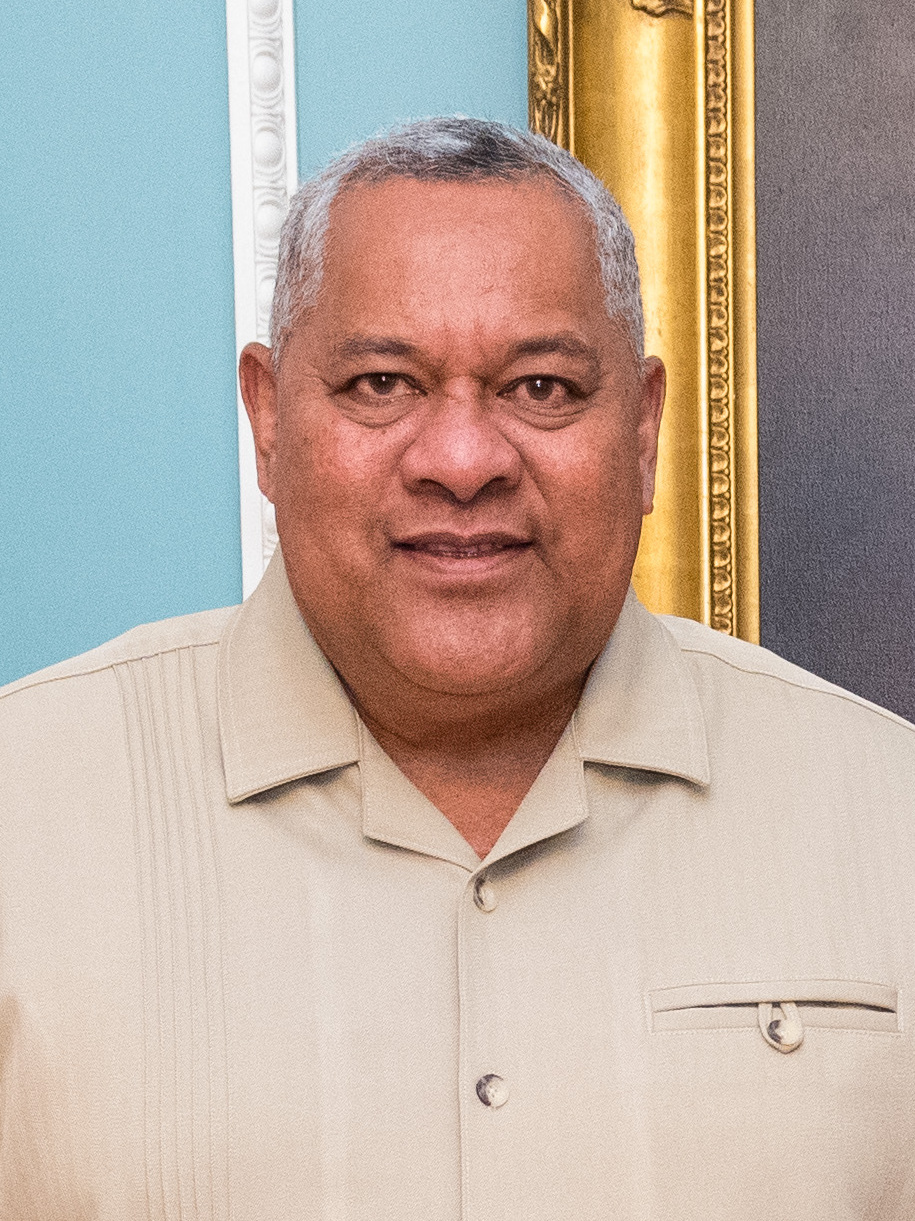
Nominee	Pula Nikolao Pula	Lemanu Peleti Mauga
Party	Nonpartisan	Nonpartisan
Alliance	Republican	Democratic
Running mate	Pulu Ae Ae Jr.	Eleasalo Ale
Popular vote	5,846	3,925
Percentage	59.83%	40.17%
- Results by voting district: Pula Nikolao Pula: 50–55% 55–60% 60–65% 65–70% 70–75% 75–80% Lemanu Peleti Mauga: 50–55% 55–60% 65–70%
Governor before election
Lemanu Peleti Mauga
Nonpartisan
Elected Governor
Pula Nikolao Pula
Nonpartisan

Lemanu Peleti Mauga was elected governor in the 2020 general election with 60.3% of the vote. On April 10, 2024, Mauga and incumbent Lieutenant Governor Eleasalo Ale announced their campaign for reelection under the slogan "E Lavatia le Alofa" — "Love Beareth All." Prior to Magua's announcement, Paramount Chief Mauga Tasi Asuega was advocating for the Governor's reelection. Pula T. I. Nikolao Pula, former Director of the Office of Insular Affairs, announced his candidacy on March 4, 2024. Pula announced High Chief Pulu Ae Ae Jr., a former faipule for Maʻopūtasi County as hran mate.

Neither Mauga nor Pula won an outright majority in the November 5, 2024, election, triggering a runoff election on November 19. In the runoff, Pula took 59.8% of the 9,771 votes cast to win the governorship, flipping the seat for the Republicans by a margin of nearly 20 percentage points in the runoff.

2024 American Samoa gubernatorial election, first round
Party	Candidate	Votes	%
Nonpartisan	Pula Nikolao Pula	4,284	42.4
Nonpartisan	Lemanu Peleti Mauga	3,660	36.2
Nonpartisan	Vaitautolu Talia Iaulualo	2,169	21.4
Total votes		10,113	100

2024 American Samoa gubernatorial election, runoff election
Party	Candidate	Votes	%
Nonpartisan	Pula Nikolao Pula	5,846	59.8
Nonpartisan	Lemanu Peleti Mauga	3,925	40.2
Total votes		9,771	100
Republican gain from Democratic			

=== Puerto Rico ===
2024 United States gubernatorial elections
- November 5, 2024
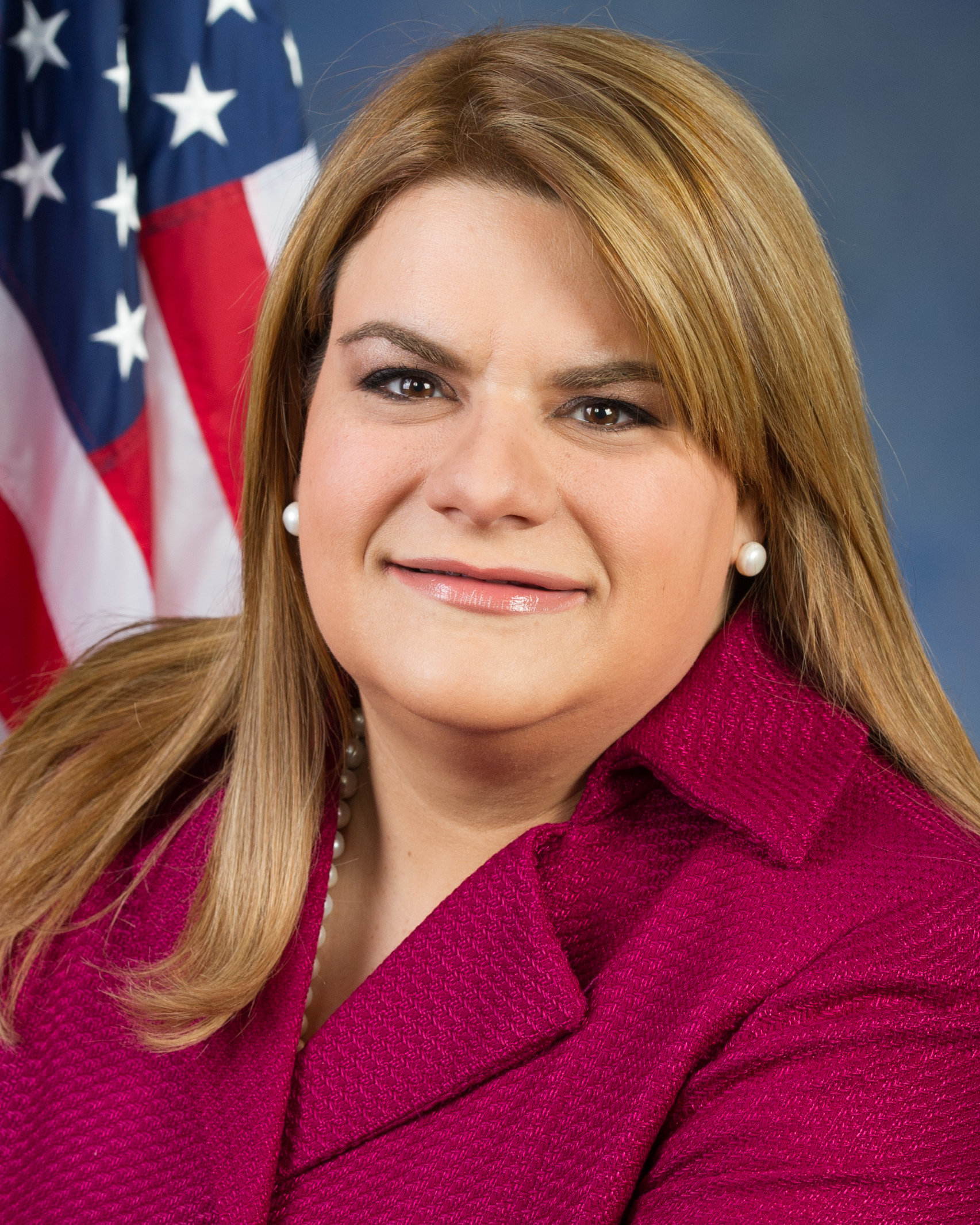

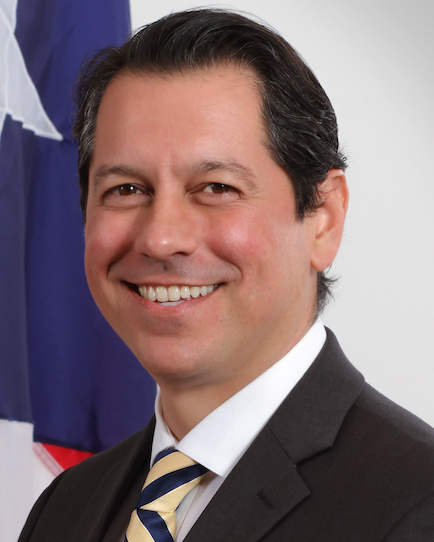

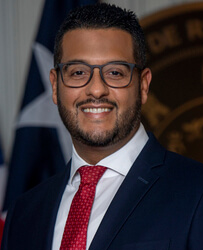

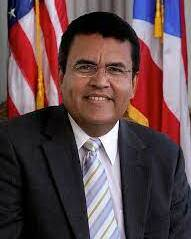
Nominee	Jenniffer González-Colón	Juan Dalmau
Party	New Progressive	Independence
Alliance	Republican	Alianza de País
Popular vote	524,373	391,945
Percentage	41.22%	30.81%
Nominee	Jesús Manuel Ortiz	Javier Jiménez
Party	Popular Democratic	Project Dignity
Alliance	Democratic	Republican
Popular vote	273,162	81,251
Percentage	21.47%	6.39%
- Results by municipality González: 30–40% 40–50% 50–60% Dalmau: 30–40% 40–50%
Governor before election
Pedro Pierluisi
New Progressive
Elected Governor
Jenniffer González-Colón
New Progressive

Governor Pedro Pierluisi was elected in 2020 with 32.9% of the vote. He announced his re-election campaign on March 20, 2022, during the New Progressive Party's general assembly. However, he was defeated by Jenniffer González-Colón, the Republican affiliated resident commissioner, in the New Progressive Party primary election.

Territorial legislator Jesús Manuel Ortiz won the nomination of the Popular Democratic Party. Other candidates include former territorial senator Juan Dalmau of the Alianza de País (an alliance between the Puerto Rican Independence Party and Citizen's Victory Movement), and San Sebastián mayor Javier Jiménez of Project Dignity. Because Citizen's Victory was required by law to field a candidate in the governor's race, Javier Córdova Iturregui was also on the ballot. Ultimately, González won the election.

New Progressive primary results
Party	Candidate	Votes	%
New Progressive	Jenniffer Gonzalez Colon	159,527	54.57%
New Progressive	Pedro Pierluisi (incumbent)	132,805	45.43%
Total votes		292,332	100.0%

Popular Democratic primary results
Party	Candidate	Votes	%
Popular Democratic	Jesús Manuel Ortiz	83,045	61.71%
Popular Democratic	Juan Zaragoza Gómez	51,534	38.29%
Total votes		134,579	100.0%

Puerto Rico gubernatorial election
Party	Candidate	Votes	%	±%
New Progressive	Jenniffer González-Colón	526,020	41.22%	+8.29
Independence	Juan Dalmau	392,185	30.73%	+17.01
Popular Democratic	Jesús Manuel Ortiz	273,649	21.44%	–10.12
Project Dignity	Javier Jiménez	81,369	6.38%	–0.52
Citizens' Victory	Javier Córdova Iturregui (Note: Paper candidate)	1,522	0.12%	–14.09
Write-in		1,362	0.11%	–0.09
Total votes		1,276,107	100.00%	
New Progressive hold				
Republican gain from Democratic				

== See also ==
- 2024 United States elections
  - 2024 United States presidential election
  - 2024 United States House of Representatives elections
  - 2024 United States Senate elections
