= 2024 American Samoa elections =

- November 5, 2024

The 2024 American Samoa elections were held on November 5, 2026 in the U.S. territory of American Samoa.

== Federal office ==
=== President ===
==== Democratic ====
- 2024 American Samoa Democratic presidential caucus

==== Republican ====
- 2024 American Samoa Republican presidential caucus

=== United States House of Representatives ===
- 2024 United States House of Representatives election in American Samoa

== Statewide office ==
=== Governor ===
- 2024 American Samoan gubernatorial election

=== Fono ===
- 2024 American Samoan House of Representatives election

== Ballot Measures ==
- Consitutional Referendum
