= Tim Flakoll =

American politician and education administrator

Tim Flakoll Provost Emeritus

Member of the North Dakota Senate from the 44th district
- In office December 1, 1998 – December 1, 2016
- Preceded by: Jim Berg
- Succeeded by: Merrill Piepkorn

Personal details
- Born: October 8, 1959 (age 66) Ellendale, North Dakota, United States
- Party: Republican

Tim Flakoll (born October 8, 1959) is an American business owner, community leader, talk radio host and politician.

== Cass County Commissioner in North Dakota ==
Flakoll is a native of Forbes, North Dakota, and has lived in Fargo, North Dakota, in Cass County all of his adult life.

Flakoll was elected to a four-year term on the Cass County Commission with 98.48% of the vote (70,528 votes) on November 5, 2024. It was the highest number of total votes received by a County Commission candidate through the first 135 years of North Dakota statehood. The Commission contains five Commissioners, and Flakoll Represents District 1.

He was a member of the North Dakota Senate from the 44th District of North Fargo, serving from December 1, 1998, through November 30, 2016.

== North Dakota Senate ==
Senator Flakoll served on the Senate Education committee for 18 years including serving as vice-chairman and as chair from 2012 - 2016. Flakoll Chaired the Senate Agriculture committee for ten years from 2002 until 2012. In the 14 years that Flakoll Chaired the Senate Education or Senate Agriculture committees, those committees never lost a committee recommendation on the Senate floor during a floor vote.

Flakoll was elected president pro tempore of the Senate, serving his term in 2013-2014 (limited by rule to one term). He was the 65th person to be elected to that position.

He is a member of the Republican Party.

== Career ==
Flakoll was a founding employee member of the Fargo Moorhead RedHawks minor league professional baseball team. From 1995 to 2001 he served in various positions of increasing responsibility including vice-president and General Manager. During those years the club qualified for the playoffs every year. In 1998 the RedHawks won their first league championship with an alltime league best 64-21 regular season record and 70-22 with playoffs. The record still stands. Baseball America magazine named the 1998 RedHawks the Independent Team of the Decade for the 1990s (FMRedHawks.com). As VP and General Manager the RedHawks won their club's first Northern League Championship and set annual attendance records.

Flakoll is an owner of the family ranch/farm in the Dakotas.

Flakoll has served as Provost for Tri-College University of Fargo-Moorhead, which includes Concordia College of Moorhead, MSUM, NDSU, M State and the North Dakota State College of Science. Tri-College campuses had a combined enrollment of more than 35,000 full and part-time students.

Flakoll was named Provost Emeritus by NDSU in 2024.

Tim Flakoll often hosts the #1 rated Jay Thomas Show on 970 WDAY AM, 93.1 FM, and worldwide on the web to expand his influence in Fargo, ND and the metro area. Shows are archived on multiple podcast platforms.
