= Pula Nikolao Pula =

Governor of American Samoa since 2025

Nikolao Pula
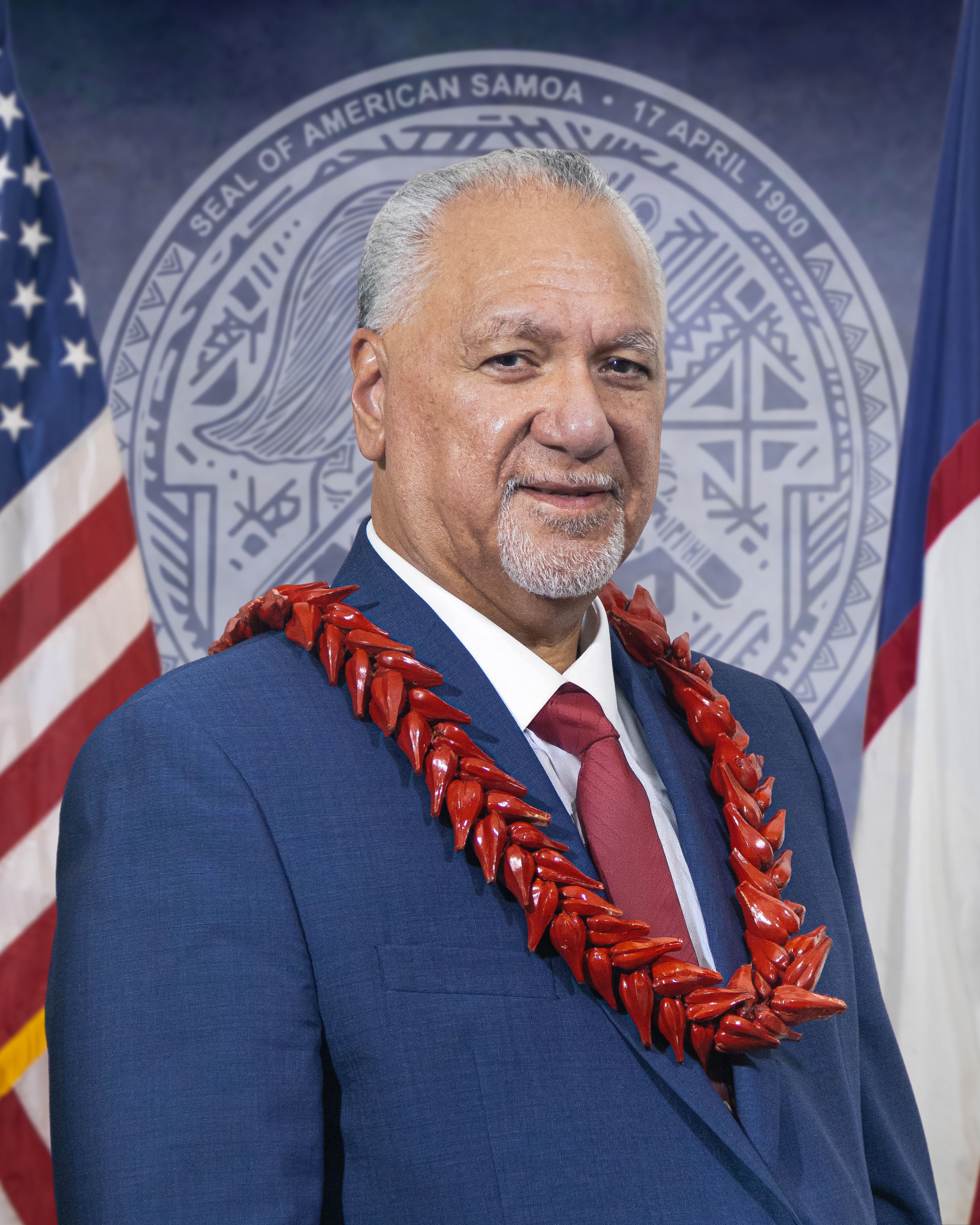
- Official portrait, 2025

9th Governor of American Samoa
- Incumbent
- Assumed office January 3, 2025
- Lieutenant: Pulu Ae Ae Jr.
- Preceded by: Lemanu Peleti Mauga

Personal details
- Born: Pulaali'i Tuiteleleapaga Iuli Nikolao Pula; December 31, 1955 (age 70) American Samoa
- Party: Republican
- Spouse: Lois Pula
- Children: 6
- Education: Menlo College (attended); Brigham Young University (attended); George Mason University (BA)
- Website: Campaign website

Pulaali'i Tuiteleleapaga Iuli Nikolao Pula (born December 31, 1955) is an American Samoan politician who is currently serving as the ninth governor of American Samoa since 2025. He ran in the 2024 American Samoan gubernatorial election and defeated incumbent Lemanu Peleti Mauga in the runoff. He is the first Republican Governor of American Samoa since 1993. Previously, he had served from 1993 to 2022 in the Office of Insular Affairs (OIA), being the OIA Director from 2002 to 2022.

== Early life and education ==
Pula was born in American Samoa. He is the youngest son of 12 children and his father was the first Samoan Director of Education. He grew up in the village of Utulei and attended Utulei elementary school. He later attended Marist Brothers High School where he graduated in 1974 and was the class valedictorian. He then furthered his education in the mainland U.S., studying at Menlo College in California. He also studied at Brigham Young University in Utah, served a mission in Samoa in 1978, and later returned to the U.S. and completed his education at George Mason University in Virginia.

== Political career ==
Following his mission, Pula worked a short stint for the reference bureau of the American Samoa Fono, the territorial legislature. In 1981, he moved to Washington, D.C., and became a special assistant for Hawaii U.S. Senator Daniel Inouye. He worked with Inouye for 11 years before joining the office of American Samoa delegate Fofō Iosefa Fiti Sunia. Pula also assisted the Sergeant at Arms of the United States Senate and was the staff director for the U.S. House subcommittee on public works and transportation.

In August 1993, Pula joined the United States Department of the Interior, specifically working for the Office of Insular Affairs (OIA). He worked as a policy desk officer from 1993 to 2000 and served as the OIA Acting Director from 1999 to 2002. He was named the Director of the OIA in 2002 and became the first Samoan ever to hold the position. In the role, he served as the executive branch liaison with four of five U.S. territories and three freely associated states, being in charge of "general policies regarding insular affairs and oversight of Federal activities." He also served as the chairman of the U.S.-Federated States of Micronesia Joint Economic Management Committee, the Federated States of Micronesia and Marshall Trust Fund Committee, and the U.S.-Marshall Islands Joint Economic Management and Financial Accountability Committee.

Pula served as the Acting Assistant Secretary of Insular Affairs for a period of nine months in 2009 and for a second time in 2014. He stepped down as OIA Director in 2022, which came after he criticized President Joe Biden's nomination of Carmen G. Cantor to be Assistant OIA Secretary.

In March 2024, Pula announced his candidacy for the 2024 American Samoan gubernatorial election. He chose Pulu Ae Ae Jr. to be his running mate and faced incumbent Lemanu Peleti Mauga in the general election. In the election, Pula received 42.4% of the vote compared to Mauga's 36.2% (4,284 votes to 3,660), which set up a runoff election as neither candidate received a majority. Two weeks later, he defeated Mauga in the runoff with 59.8% of the vote.

In December 2024, the Republican National Committee announced that Pula had joined the Republican Party, this made Pula the first Republican governor of America Samoa since Peter Tali Coleman who served in the position from 1978 to 1985, and 1989 to 1993.

== Personal life ==
Pula married Lois Ellen Pula, a professor of nursing at Georgetown University. They have six children together and as of 2023, have 22 grandchildren.

== Electoral history ==
2024 American Samoa gubernatorial election
Candidate	Running mate	First round		Second round	
Candidate	Running mate	Votes	%	Votes	%
Pula Nikolao Pula	Pulu Ae Ae Jr.	4,284	42.4%	5,846	59.8%
Lemanu Peleti Mauga (incumbent)	Laapui Talauega Eleasao Ale (incumbent)	3,660	36.2%	3,925	40.2%
Vaitautolu Talia Iaulualo	Maefau Dr Mary Taufetee	2,169	21.4%		

Party political offices
Preceded by Nua Mailo Saoluaga	Republican nominee for Governor of American Samoa; 2024	Most recent
Political offices
Preceded by Lemanu Peleti Mauga	Governor of American Samoa; 2025–present	Incumbent
