= 2024 American Samoan general election =

- Gubernatorial election
- November 5, 2024 (first round); November 19, 2024 (runoff)
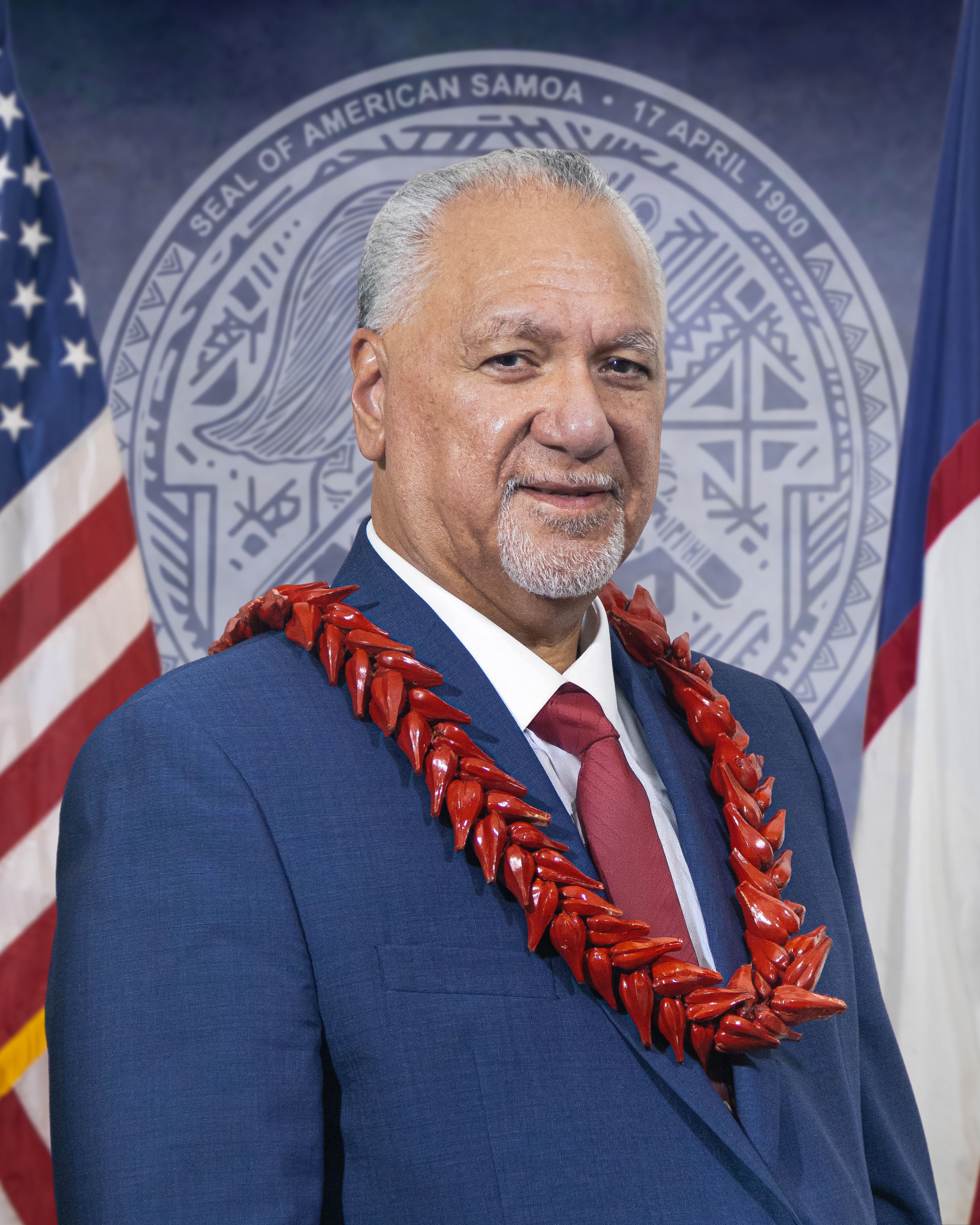

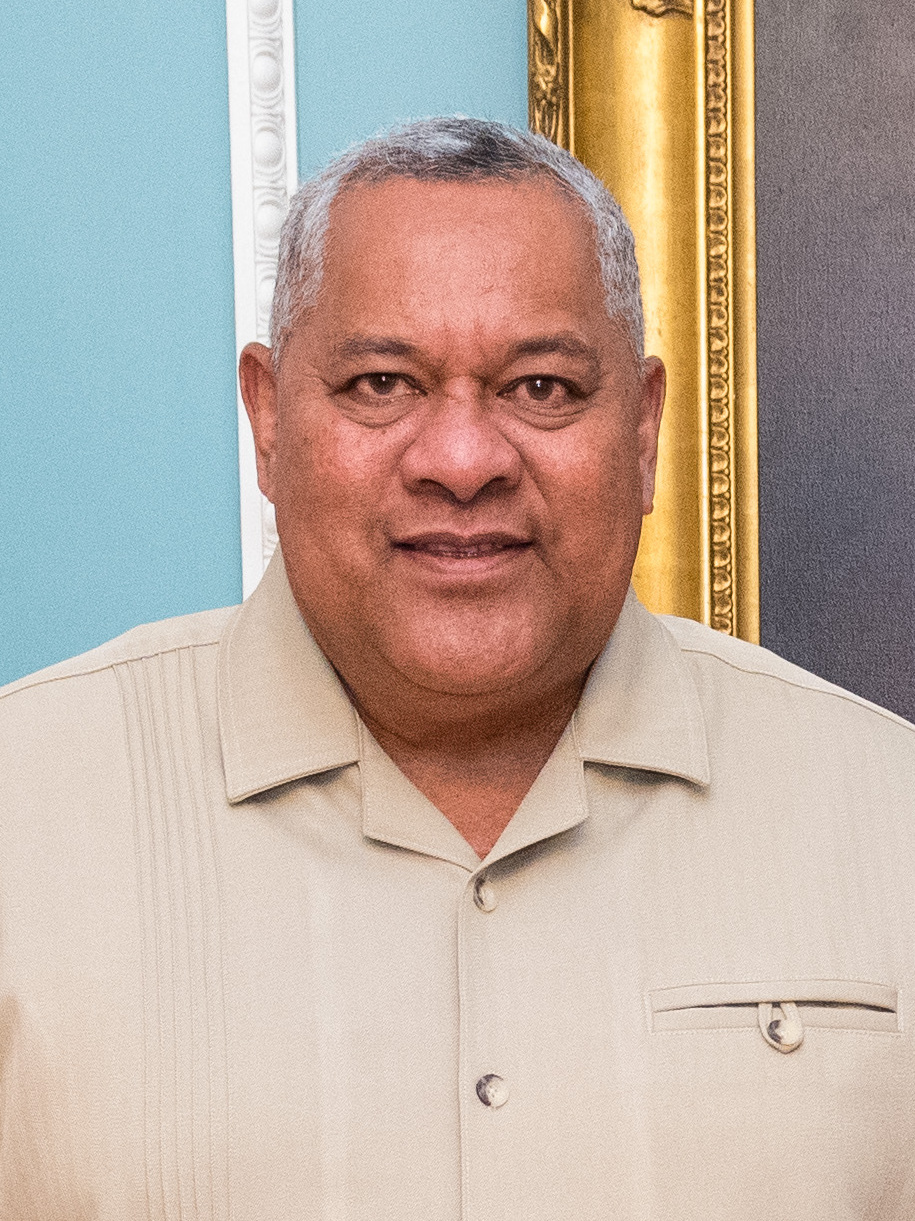
Nominee	Pula Nikolao Pula	Lemanu Peleti Mauga
Party	Independent	Independent
Alliance	Republican	Democratic
Running mate	Pulu Ae Ae Jr.	Eleasalo Ale
Popular vote	5,846	3,925
Percentage	59.83%	40.17%
- Results by voting district: Pula Nikolao Pula: 50–55% 55–60% 60–65% 65–70% 70–75% 75–80% Lemanu Peleti Mauga: 50–55% 55–60% 65–70%
Governor before election
Lemanu Peleti Mauga
Democratic
Elected Governor
Pula Nikolao Pula
Republican
- Delegate election
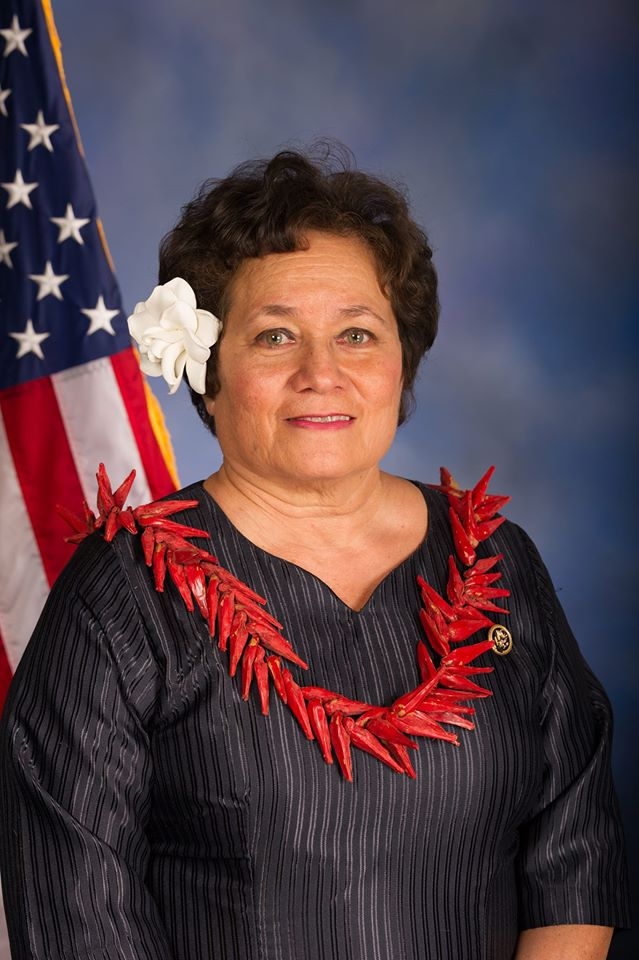

Candidate	Amata Coleman Radewagen	Luisa Kuaea
Party	Republican	Democratic
Popular vote	7,394	1,840
Percentage	74.78%	18.61%
- Results by voting district: Aumua Amata Coleman Radewagen: 60–65% 65–70% 70–75% 75–80% 80–85% Luisa Kuaea: 55–60%
Delegate at-large before election
Amata Coleman Radewagen
Republican
Elected Delegate at-large
Amata Coleman Radewagen
Republican
- House of Representatives
- November 5, 2024
- All 21 seats in the American Samoa House of Representatives; 12 seats needed for a majority
Party	Leader	Vote %	Seats	+/–
Nonpartisans			16	
Republican			4	
Swains Island Delegate			1	
This lists parties that won seats. See the complete results below.

General elections were held in American Samoa on Tuesday, November 5, 2024. Voters elected a governor, lieutenant governor, faipule (members) of the House of Representatives, and the American Samoan delegate to the United States Congress. The gubernatorial election required a run-off on November 19 as no candidate received a majority of the vote in the first round. Republican Pula Nikolao Pula was elected governor and Pulu Ae Ae Jr. as lieutenant governor. They defeated the incumbent Democrat governor and lieutenant governor Lemanu Peleti Mauga and Eleasalo Ale by a margin of nearly 20 percentage points in the runoff. Both are affiliated with the Republican Party.

Incumbent delegate, Rep. Amata Coleman Radewagen, a Republican who had held the seat since 2015, was overwhelmingly re-elected to the United States House of Representatives for a sixth term.

This marks the first time that Republicans have won all statewide races in American Samoa held in the same year.

== Delegate election ==
Republican incumbent Amata Coleman Radewagen was reelected, winning nearly 75% of the vote. Radewagen faced challenges by Democrats Luisa Kuaea and Meleagi Suitonu-Chapman, as well as independent candidate Fualaau Rosie Tago Lancaster.

== Gubernatorial election ==
Lemanu Peleti Mauga was elected governor in the 2020 general election with 60.3% of the vote. On April 10, 2024, Mauga and incumbent Lieutenant Governor Eleasalo Ale announced their campaign for reelection under the slogan "E Lavatia le Alofa" ('Love Beareth All'). Prior to Magua's announcement, Paramount Chief Mauga Tasi Asuega was advocating for the governor's reelection. Pula T. I. Nikolao Pula, former director of the Office of Insular Affairs, announced his candidacy on March 4, 2024. Pula announced High Chief Pulu Ae Ae Jr., a former faipule for Maʻopūtasi County, as his running mate. Also on the ballot were Vaitautolu l’aulualo and his running mate Mary Taufetee, who were campaigning with the slogan "United for Change."

On November 5, Pula won a plurality of votes, 42.4%, in the three-way governor's race. However, American Samoa requires a winner to earn more than 50% of the votes cast. A runoff election between Pula and Mauga was held on November 19. Pula ultimately emerged victorious and defeated the incumbent governor Lemanu Peleti Mauga, receiving nearly 60% of the total votes.

== Fono election ==
All 20 seats in the House of Representatives were up for reelection, although four seats were uncontested.

== Referendum ==
Voters also considered a constitutional amendment that would give the Fono the power to override the a gubernatorial veto of legislation. Under the existing Constitution of American Samoa, the U.S. Secretary of the Interior has the power to overrule a veto by the governor. Voters rejected the amendment with 57.7% of votes cast against changing the veto override process.

== Results ==
=== Governor ===
Candidate	Running mate	First round		Second round	
Candidate	Running mate	Votes	%	Votes	%
Pula Nikolao Pula	Pulu Ae Ae Jr.	4,284	42.36	5,846	59.83
Lemanu Peleti Mauga	Eleasalo Ale	3,660	36.19	3,925	40.17
Vaitautolu Talia Iaulualo	Maefau Dr Mary Taufetee	2,169	21.45		
Total		10,113	100.00	9,771	100.00
Source: Election Office

=== Delegate ===
Candidate	Votes	%
Amata Coleman Radewagen	7,394	74.78
Luisa Kuaea	1,840	18.61
Fualaau Rosie Lancaster	469	4.74
Meleagi Suitonu-Chapman	185	1.87
Total	9,888	100.00
Source: Election Office

=== Fono ===
Seventeen incumbents were re-elected, with four losing their seats.

District	Candidate	Votes	%	Notes
1 – Manuʻa	Fetui Fetu Jr.	228	25.36	Elected
1 – Manuʻa	Vala Porotesano Liusamoa	201	22.36	Elected
1 – Manuʻa	Paepaetele Mapu Jamias	162	18.02	
1 – Manuʻa	Faauifono Vaitautolu	133	14.79	Unseated
1 – Manuʻa	Faleto'a Elijah J. Leasau	113	12.57	
1 – Manuʻa	Tuisalia Ofisa Asoau	62	6.90	
2 – Manuʻa	Tiaoalii Fauagiga T. Sai	186	57.94	Elected
2 – Manuʻa	Faiai Loleni Faiai	135	42.06	
3 – Vaifanua	Shaun Onosai Vaa	204	39.23	Elected
3 – Vaifanua	Feagaimaalii Solimio Aoelua	123	23.65	
3 – Vaifanua	Tuaomalotumau Lonenoa Gaoteote Faoa	86	16.54	
3 – Vaifanua	Taua Olomua Taua Jr.	85	16.35	
3 – Vaifanua	Tuna Porotesano	22	4.23	
4 – Saole	Va'asa Simanu	226	59.01	Elected
4 – Saole	Titiali'i Kitara Vaiau	157	40.99	Unseated
5 – Sua #1	Luaitaua Gene Pan	201	46.85	Elected
5 – Sua #1	Dora J. Ah Sue	123	28.67	
5 – Sua #1	Henry B. Auvaa	105	24.48	
6 – Sua #2	Avagafono Tuavao Vaimaga Maiava	269	100	Elected
7 – Maoputasi #1	Vailoata Eteuati Amituana'i	223	69.47	Elected
7 – Maoputasi #1	Sesula Fepuleai McMoore Tufele	98	30.53	
8 – Maoputasi #2	Malaeoletalu Melesio Gurr	365	100	Elected
9 – Maoputasi #3	Trudge Gasetotolemasina Ledoux-Sunia	383	55.11	Elected
9 – Maoputasi #3	Kiso Skelton	164	23.60	
9 – Maoputasi #3	Vesiai Poyer S. Samuelu	148	21.29	Unseated
10 – Maoputasi #4	Tapai Alailepule Ben Vaivao	118	58.13	Elected
10 – Maoputasi #4	Talali Perry T. Loloaso Wightman Uia	85	41.87	
11 – Maoputasi #5	Faimealelei Anthony Fu'e Allen	329	100	Elected
12 – Ituau	Manumaua Wayne Wilson	710	32.52	Elected
12 – Ituau	Sauasetoa Tautoloitua Soliai Ho Ching	644	29.50	Elected
12 – Ituau	Fagasoaia Mark Atafua	422	19.33	
12 – Ituau	Faafeo Lagafuaina	321	14.70	
12 – Ituau	Loimata Soliai Tema Samagu Aiulua Afo	86	3.94	
13 – Fofo	Fiu John Saelua	639	100	Elected
14 – Alataua	Savali Talavou Ale	342	83.21	Elected
14 – Alataua	Mona Uli	69	16.79	
15 – Tualauta	Larry S. Sanitoa	1,276	32.13	Elected
15 – Tualauta	Ben Vaomu Sauvao	775	19.52	Elected
15 – Tualauta	Samuel Ioka Ale Meleisea	666	16.77	Unseated
15 – Tualauta	Ti'alemasunu Dr. Mikaele Etuale	627	15.79	
15 – Tualauta	Leomiti F. Leomiti	367	9.24	
15 – Tualauta	Bartley Lucia Su'a Papalii	260	6.55	
16 – Tualautai	Manavaalofa Tutuila Manase	280	42.04	Elected
16 – Tualautai	Olosega Lui Maea	196	29.43	
16 – Tualautai	Moira Maiava	190	28.53	
17 – Leasina	Ape Mike Asifoa	266	68.73	Elected
17 – Leasina	Arrianna Princess Auvaa	67	17.31	
17 – Leasina	Fausalii I. Iose	54	13.95	
Source: Election Office

=== Constitutional referendum ===
Choice	Votes	%
For	4,134	42.33
Against	5,631	57.67
Total	9,765	100.00
Source: Election Office

== See also ==
- List of American Samoa Fono
