= Merrill Piepkorn =

American politician (born 1949)

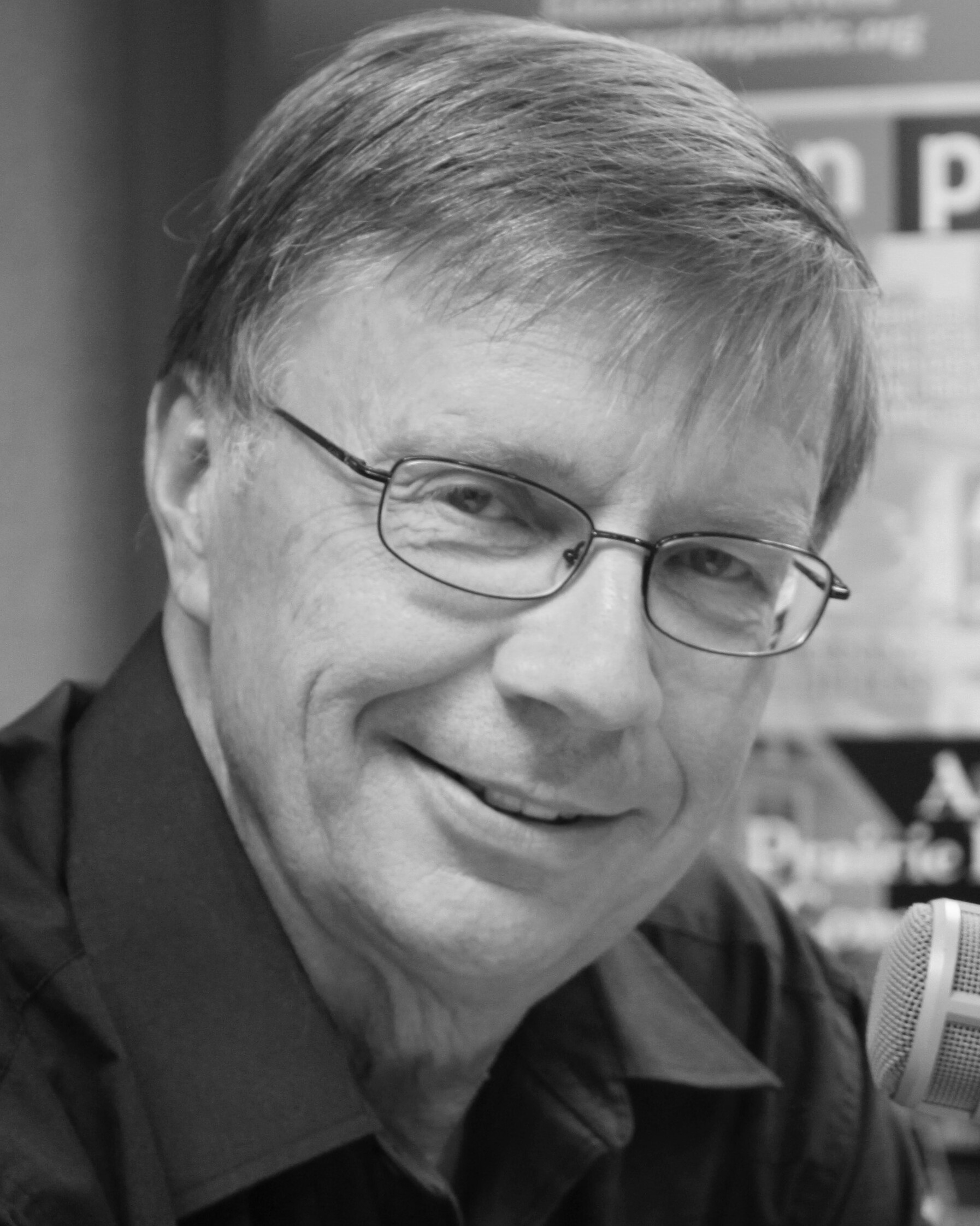
- Piepkorn in 2010

Member of the North Dakota Senate from the 44th district
- In office December 1, 2016 – December 1, 2024
- Preceded by: Tim Flakoll
- Succeeded by: Joshua Boschee

Personal details
- Born: June 9, 1949 (age 76) Stanley, North Dakota, U.S.
- Party: Democratic-NPL
- Spouse: Connie
- Children: 1
- Education: Concordia College (BA); North Dakota State University
- Website: Official website

Merrill Piepkorn (born June 9, 1949) is an American entertainer and politician who served in the North Dakota Senate from the 44th district from 2016 to 2024. He is a member of the Democratic-NPL Party. He has also hosted radio shows on Prairie Public Radio and served as the public address announcer for the Fargo-Moorhead RedHawks.

In 2024, Piepkorn won the Democratic nomination for governor of North Dakota, and lost to Republican nominee Kelly Armstrong in the general election.

== Early life and career ==
Piepkorn was born on June 9, 1949. He attended Concordia College and graduated in 1974. After graduation, Piepkorn co-founded a country band called Skunk Hollow.

Piepkorn worked for Prairie Public Radio, hosting "Morning Edition" while he was a graduate student at North Dakota State University. In 1999, he co-created and began hosting the radio show "Here & Now". Piepkorn became the public address announcer for the Fargo-Moorhead RedHawks, a Minor League Baseball team, for the 1997 season. He stayed in the role through the 2006 season. Piepkorn co-founded a band called the Radio Stars in 2008. He created, hosted, and served as executive producer of "Dakota Air" on Prairie Public Radio, which debuted in 2010.

== Political career ==
Piepkorn ran for the North Dakota Senate as a member of the Democratic-NPL Party in 2016. He defeated Tim Flakoll, the incumbent state senator, in the November general election. Flakoll sought a rematch in 2020, and Piepkorn won reelection. He won reelection in 2022 with 62% of the vote against Republican Bjorn Altenburg. In November 2022, Piepkorn was elected to serve as assistant minority leader of the state senate.

On April 2, 2024, Piepkorn announced that he would run for governor of North Dakota in the 2024 election. He won the party's nomination at their convention in April. He selected Patrick Hart as his running mate for lieutenant governor of North Dakota. In the general election Piepkorn lost to Kelly Armstrong.

== Personal life ==
Piepkorn and his wife Connie live in Fargo, North Dakota. They have one son and two grandchildren. He is Lutheran.

North Dakota Senate
Preceded by Tim Flakoll	Member of the North Dakota Senate from the 44th district 2016–2024	Succeeded by Joshua Boschee
Party political offices
Preceded by Shelley Lenz	Democratic nominee for Governor of North Dakota; 2024	Most recent
