= Lemanu Peleti Mauga =

Governor of American Samoa from 2021 to 2025

Peleti Mauga
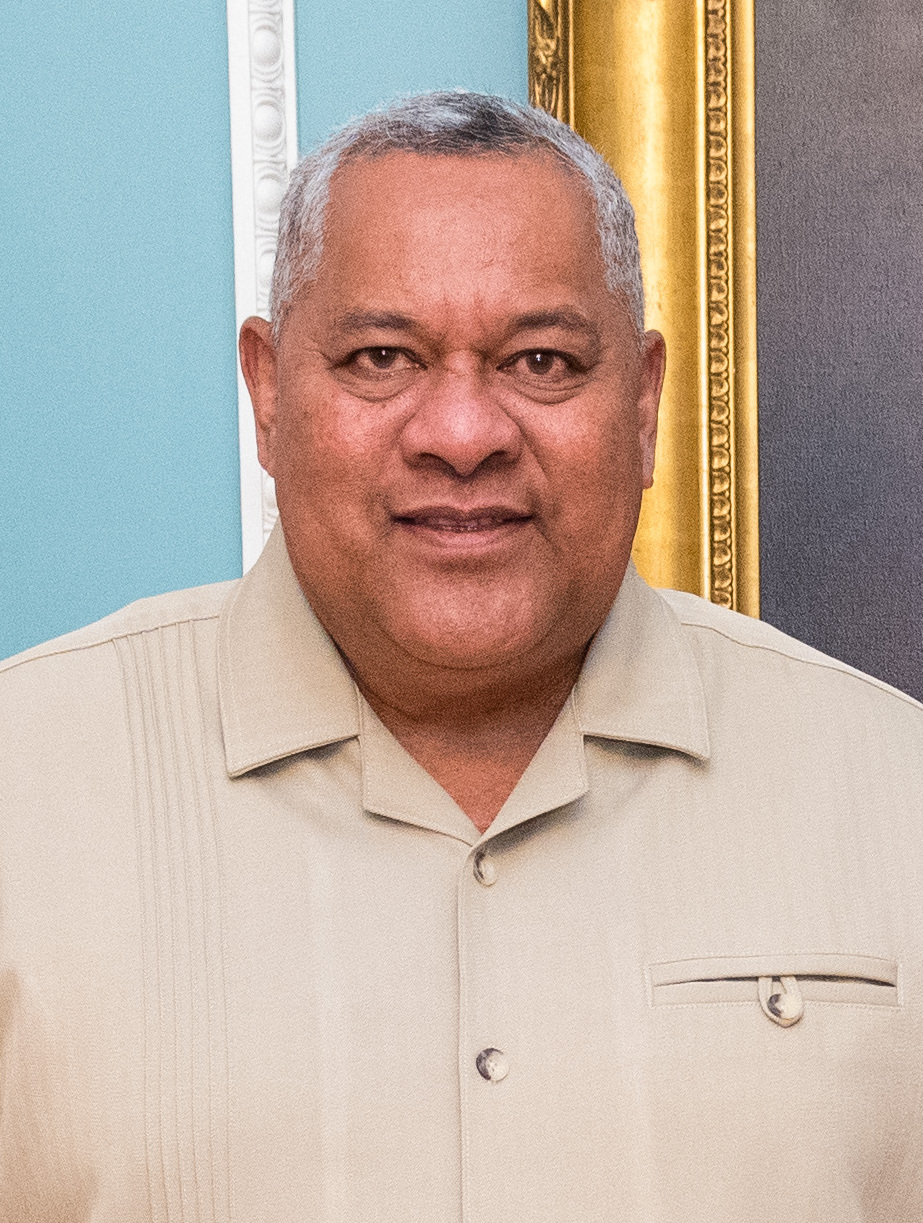
- Mauga in 2023

8th Governor of American Samoa
- In office January 3, 2021 – January 3, 2025
- Lieutenant: Salo Ale
- Preceded by: Lolo Matalasi Moliga
- Succeeded by: Pula Nikolao Pula

9th Lieutenant Governor of American Samoa
- In office January 3, 2013 – January 3, 2021
- Governor: Lolo Matalasi Moliga
- Preceded by: Faoa Aitofele Sunia
- Succeeded by: Salo Ale

Personal details
- Born: Palepoi Sialegā Mauga; January 3, 1960 (age 66) Nuʻuuli, American Samoa, U.S.
- Party: Democratic
- Spouses: Pohakalani Mauga (m. 1988; died 2016); Ella Failautusi (m. 2018)
- Education: American Samoa Community College (attended); University of Hawaii, Manoa (BA); San Diego State University (MPA)

Military service
- Branch/service: United States Army
- Rank: Major
- Battles/wars: Persian Gulf War

Lemanu Palepoi Sialegā Mauga (born January 3, 1960) is an American Samoan politician who served as the eighth governor of American Samoa from 2021 to 2025. A member of the Democratic Party, Mauga served as a senator in the American Samoa Senate, where he became the chairman of both the Budget and Appropriations Committee and the Senate Homeland Security Committee.

== Early life and education ==
Mauga was born in Nuʻuuli, American Samoa. After attending the American Samoa Community College, he earned a Bachelor of Arts degree from the University of Hawaiʻi at Mānoa. He received a master's degree in public administration from San Diego State University on July 30, 2012, a graduation ceremony held at the Governor H. Rex Lee Auditorium in American Samoa.

== Career ==
Mauga served in the U.S. military for more than 20 years, including in the Gulf War and the Iraq and Afghanistan wars before he retired with the rank of major. Following his retirement, Mauga became the director of Army Instructions and continued to work with American Samoa's JROTC.

Mauga also became the chief property manager for the Government of American Samoa's office of property management. He became an American Samoan Senator in 2009.

=== Politics ===
In October 2011, gubernatorial candidate Lolo Letalu Matalasi Moliga picked Mauga as his running mate for lieutenant governor of American Samoa in the forthcoming 2012 gubernatorial election on November 6, 2012. Mauga was Lieutenant Governor of American Samoa from 2013 to 2021.

In the 2020 American Samoa gubernatorial election, Mauga and his running mate Talauega Eleasalo Ale were elected governor and lieutenant governor respectively. Mauga assumed the office in January 2021.

In the 2024 American Samoa gubernatorial election, Mauga and his running mate Talauega Eleasalo Ale sought re-election but were ultimately defeated by Pulaali'i Tuiteleleapaga Iuli Nikolao Pula and Pulu Ae Ae Jr. in the runoff.

Political offices
Preceded by Faoa Aitofele Sunia	Lieutenant Governor of American Samoa; 2013–2021	Succeeded by Salo Ale
Preceded by Lolo Matalasi Moliga	Governor of American Samoa; 2021–2025	Succeeded by Pula Nikolao Pula
Party political offices
Preceded by Lolo Matalasi Moliga	Democratic nominee for Governor of American Samoa; 2020, 2024	Most recent
