= Pulu Ae Ae Jr. =

American Samoan politician (born 1945)

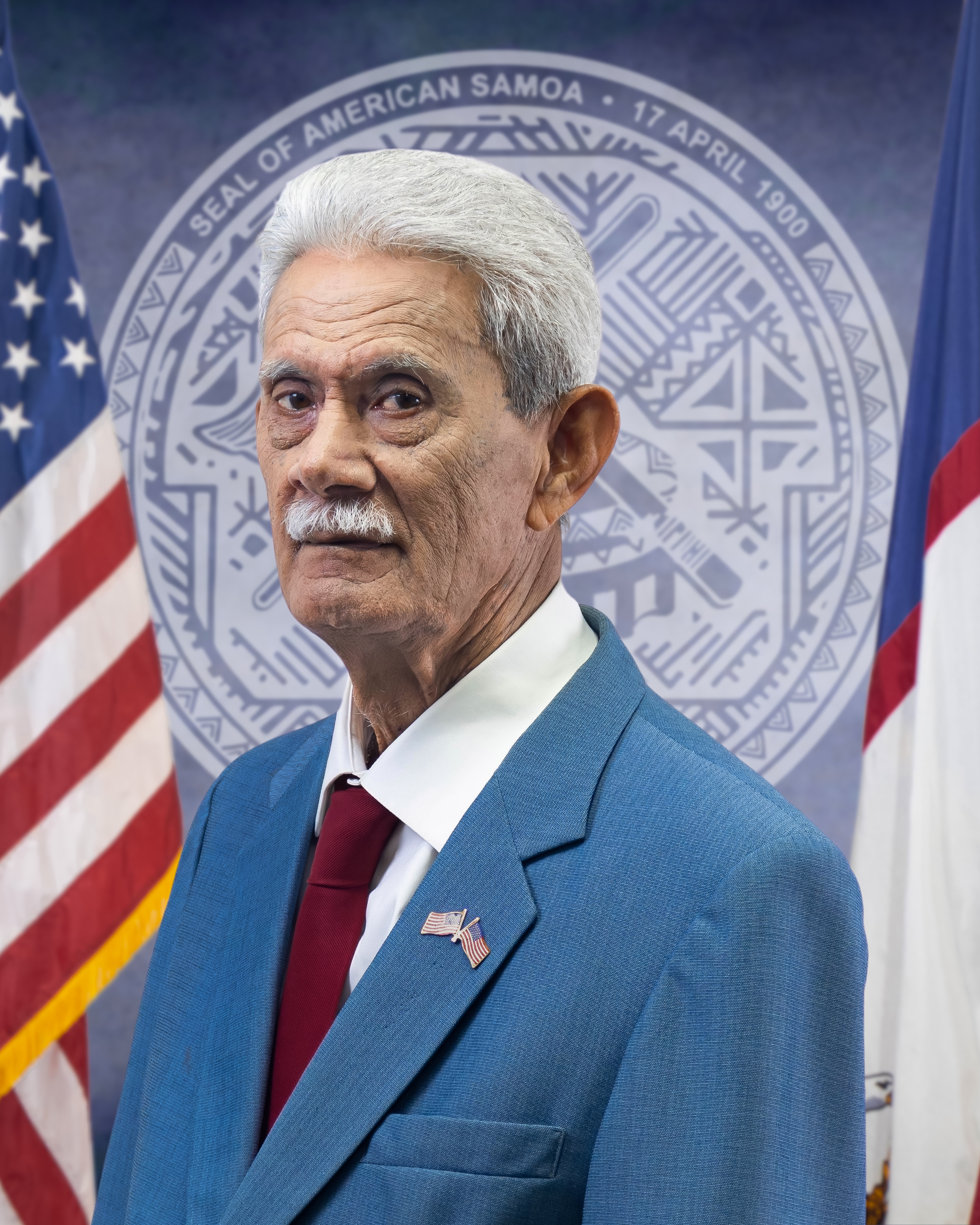
- Official portrait, 2025

11th Lieutenant Governor of American Samoa
- Incumbent
- Assumed office January 3, 2025
- Governor: Pula Nikolao Pula
- Preceded by: Eleasalo Ale

Personal details
- Born: June 1945 (age 81) Pago Pago, American Samoa
- Party: Republican
- Spouse: Titilupe Ae (m. 1970)

Pulumataala Ae Ae Jr. (born June 1945) is an American Samoan politician who is currently serving as the 11th lieutenant governor of American Samoa since 2025. He was elected along with his running mate Pula Nikolao Pula in the 2024 American Samoan gubernatorial election. He previously served as mayor of Pago Pago and as a faipule (member) of the American Samoa House of Representatives.

== Early life ==
Ae was born in Pago Pago, American Samoa, and grew up there. He attended the High School of American Samoa (now Samoana High School) where he graduated in 1965. After high school, he moved to the mainland U.S. and enlisted in the United States Army. He served 20 years in the Army, including serving in Operation Desert Storm and touring Iraq and Kuwait.

== Political career ==
After returning to American Samoa following his tenure in the military, Ae entered public service and was eventually appointed the pulenu'u (mayor) of Pago Pago. After five years as mayor of Pago Pago, Ae was elected a faipule (member) of the American Samoa House of Representatives. He was known for his advocacy for "transparency and accountability in government" and according to the Samoa News, during his tenure in the House of Representatives, Ae "was a vocal and sometimes controversial figure who was not afraid to fight for his constitutional rights and challenged decisions within the legislative body. His outbursts, which got him suspended one time, are the stuff of legend." One source noted him to be "an outspoken straight shooter who shoots from the hip."

Ae left the legislature after 10 years of service. Afterwards, he became a local High Chief and remained in politics as the director of the field office for U.S. House delegate Amata Coleman Radewagen, a position he served in for 10 years.

In April 2024, Ae was announced as the running mate of Pula Nikolao Pula in the 2024 American Samoan gubernatorial election. He told the Samoa News that Pula had "called him out of the blue ... and asked him if he would be his running mate." He said that he accepted it after believing it was "a sign from God that this is my calling so that I can help the people of American Samoa." Running against the incumbent governor Lemanu Peleti Mauga and Mauga's running mate Eleasalo Ale, Ae and Pula received 42.4% of the vote compared to Mauga and Ale's 36.2% (4,284 votes to 3,660), setting up a runoff election two weeks after election day. Ae and Pula won in the runoff with 59.8% of the vote. With Ae becoming the lieutenant governor-elect, it marked the first time in American Samoa's history that the governor was younger than the lieutenant governor.

== Personal life ==
Ae married Titilupe Ae and has eight children with her. As of 2024, they had been married for 54 years. He is a Christian.

Political offices
Preceded by Eleasalo Ale	Lieutenant Governor of American Samoa; 2025–present	Incumbent
