= Eleasalo Ale =

American politician

Salo Ale
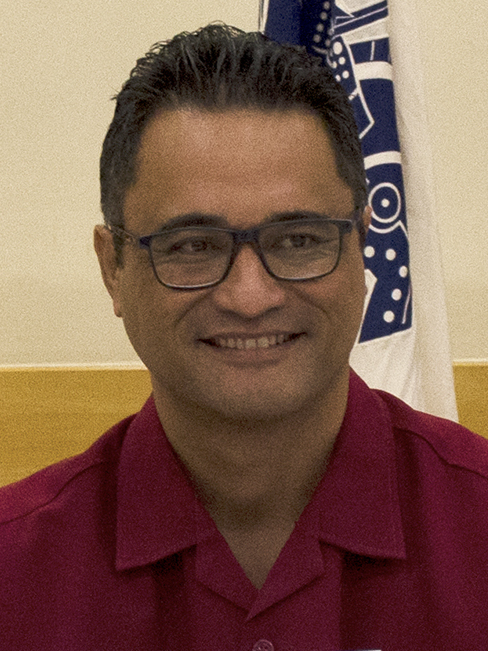
- Salo Ale in 2019

10th Lieutenant Governor of American Samoa
- In office January 3, 2021 – January 3, 2025
- Governor: Peleti Mauga
- Preceded by: Peleti Mauga
- Succeeded by: Pulu Ae Ae Jr.

17th Attorney General of American Samoa
- In office January 28, 2014 – February 19, 2020
- Governor: Lolo Matalasi Moliga
- Preceded by: Afoa Moega Lutu
- Succeeded by: Mitzie Jessop Taase (acting)

Personal details
- Born: Eleasalo Va'alele Ale; February 17, 1969 (age 57) Nua ma Se'etaga, American Samoa, U.S.
- Party: Democratic
- Spouse: Marian Tiare McGuire
- Children: 3
- Education: Truman State University (BA); Drake University (JD)

La'apui Talauega Eleasalo Va'alele "Salo" Ale (born February 17, 1969) is an American Samoan attorney who served as the tenth lieutenant governor of American Samoa, from 2021 to 2025. He previously served as Attorney General of American Samoa from 2014 to 2020. On January 13, 2020, Ale resigned as attorney general to pursue politics.

== Early life and education ==
Ale was born in Nua ma Se'etaga, Tutuila, American Samoa and attended Marist Brothers High School, graduating in 1986. He left American Samoa to earn a Bachelor of Arts degree from Truman State University in Missouri in 1990 and a Juris Doctor from the Drake University Law School in Iowa, graduating in 1994.

== Career ==
After earning his undergraduate degree, Ale worked as a legislative assistant to then-U.S. Senator Daniel Inouye. After law school, he served as a clerk for Judge James Burns on the Hawaii Intermediate Court of Appeals. For 17 years, Ale worked as an attorney at Faegre Baker Daniels in Minneapolis. In 2003, Governor Tim Pawlenty appointed Ale to the Council on Asian-Pacific Minnesotans for a term ending in 2006. Ale served on the council until his appointment as Attorney General of American Samoa. He was succeeded by David Maeda.

Ale was nominated to serve as the 10th Attorney General of American Samoa in 2014 by then-Governor Lolo Matalasi Moliga. As Attorney General, he and a bipartisan group of attorneys general supported the 2019 extension of the Autism CARES Act of 2014. He joined another bipartisan group of attorneys general supporting the Ending Forced Arbitration of Sexual Harassment Act of 2017.

He resigned from his position in 2020, citing an interest in seeking another elective office. Ale and Mauga placed first in the November general election. Ale assumed office as Lieutenant Governor on January 3, 2021.

Ale serves as the chair of the task force countering the COVID-19 pandemic in American Samoa.

== Personal life ==
Ale is married to Marian Tiare McGuire, an attorney who previously worked for the American Samoa government. They have three children and live in Nua & Se'etaga.

Legal offices
Preceded by Afoa Moega Lutu	Attorney General of American Samoa; 2014–2020	Succeeded by Mitzie Jessop Taase; Acting
Political offices
Preceded by Lemanu Peleti Mauga	Lieutenant Governor of American Samoa; 2021–2025	Succeeded by Pulu Ae Ae Jr.
