= List of North Dakota State University people =

North Dakota State University, formerly North Dakota State University of Agriculture and Applied Sciences, is a public land-grant research university in Fargo, North Dakota, United States. It was founded as North Dakota Agricultural College in 1890 and was called North Dakota State University of Agriculture and Applied Sciences starting in 1960. Following is a list of notabile alumni, faculty, and staff of North Dakota State University.

== Alumni ==
=== Academia ===
- R. James Cook (BS 1958, MS 1961) – phytopathologist and professor at Washington State University
- William Costello – professor in the department of animal and range science at South Dakota State University
- Jaime C. Grunlan (BS 1997) – professor of Mechanical Engineering at Texas A&M University
- Melissa Grunlan (BS 1995, MS 1997) – professor in the Department of Biomedical Engineering at Texas A&M University
- Beverly P. Lynch (BS, Litt.D.) – Professor Emerita at the UCLA School of Education and Information Studies
- Mancur Olson (1954) – economist and political scientist who taught at the University of Maryland, College Park
- Donald Pederson (BS 1948) – professor of electrical engineering at the University of California, Berkeley
- Lilian Imuetinyan Salami – Vice-Chancellor, University of Benin
- Richard J. Sauer (Ph.D.) – deputy vice-president and interim president of the University of Minnesota; head of the entomology department at Kansas State University
- Edward Arthur Steinhaus (1932) – professor of pathobiology and first dean of biological sciences at the University of California, Irvine; insect pathologist with the University of California, Berkeley

=== Art and architecture ===
- William C. Albrant – architect
- Knute Haugsjaa (1939) – architect
- Edward Vance – architect

=== Business ===
- David Bernauer – former CEO and chairman of Walgreens

=== Entertainment ===
- Alf Clausen – composer
- Audra Mari – Miss North Dakota USA 2014 and Miss World America 2016
- Frank Scott (non-degreed) – musician and arranger with the Lawrence Welk orchestra
- Blaize Shiek – NFL cheerleader

=== Law ===
- Donald Hawk Crothers (non-degreed) – Chief Justice of the High Court of American Samoa; North Dakota House of Representatives

=== Literature and journalism ===
- Humayun Ahmed – writer and filmmaker
- Kade Ferris – writer, Tribal Historic Preservation Officer for the for the Red Lake Chippewa and the Turtle Mountain Chippewa
- Thomas McGrath (BA) – poet
- Earl Mindell – writer and nutritionist

=== Military ===
- Loren D. Hagen – US Army Special Forces Green Beret and Medal of Honor recipient
- Verne J. McCaul – lieutenant general in the United States Marine Corps who served as the Director of Aviation and the 7th Assistant Commandant of the Marine Corps
- Charles F. Wald – former Deputy Commander of United States European Command

=== Politics ===
- Mark Andrews – United States Senate
- Rick Berg – United States House of Representatives
- John Burkel (non-degreed) – Minnesota House of Representatives
- Doug Burgum – United States Secretary of Interior, Governor of North Dakota, and founder of Great Plains Software
- Elmer W. Cart – North Dakota Public Service Commissioner
- Bill Christiansen – Lieutenant Governor of Montana, Montana House of Representatives
- Tony Clark – North Dakota Public Service Commissioner
- David Clemens (BS) – North Dakota Senate
- Hamida Dakane – North Dakota House of Representatives
- Sebastian Ertelt (BS) – North Dakota House of Representatives
- Jay Fisher (BS, MS) – North Dakota House of Representatives; director of the North Central Research Extension Center at North Dakota State University from 1994 to 2015
- Jean Guy – First Lady of North Dakota
- William L. Guy – Governor of North Dakota
- LaurieBeth Hager (MS) – North Dakota House of Representatives
- Jared Hagert (BA 1998) – North Dakota House of Representatives
- Karla Rose Hanson (BA 1994) – North Dakota House of Representatives
- Jason Heitkamp (BS, MS) – North Dakota Senate
- Ralph Herseth – 21st governor of South Dakota
- Michael Howe (BS 2010) – Secretary of State of North Dakota and North Dakota House of Representatives
- Jason Isaacson (BS, MA) – Minnesota Senate and Minnesota House of Representatives
- Zac Ista (BA) – North Dakota House of Representatives
- Tom Kading (BS 2010) – North Dakota House of Representatives
- Brian Kroshus (BA 1986) – North Dakota Public Service Commission and Tax Commissioner of North Dakota
- Oley Larsen (MS) – North Dakota Senate
- Randy Lemm (BS) – North Dakota Senate
- Arthur A. Link – Governor of North Dakota, United States House of Representatives, Speaker of the North Dakota House of Representatives
- Donald Longmuir (BS) – North Dakota House of Representatives
- Warren Magnuson (non-degreed) – United States Senate, United States House of Representatives, and Washington House of Representatives
- Tim Mathern (BA 1971) – North Dakota Senate
- Roger Moe (non-degreed) – Minnesota Senate
- Marshall W. Moore (1951) – North Dakota House of Representatives
- Dennis Nehring – politician
- Marvin Nelson (BS) – North Dakota House of Representatives
- Ilhan Omar – U.S. Representative, Minnesota's 5th congressional district
- Dale Patten (BS) – North Dakota Senate
- Joseph Peltier (1951) – North Dakota House of Representatives and North Dakota State Board of Higher Education
- Jim Roers (BS) – North Dakota Senate
- Paul Thomas (BS 1996) – North Dakota Senate and North Dakota House of Representatives
- Jessica Unruh-Bell (BS) – North Dakota Senate
- Milton R. Young – United States. Senator
- John E. Yunker – North Dakota Senate

=== Religion ===
- Austin Vetter (BA) – prelate of the Roman Catholic Church; bishop of the Diocese of Helena

=== Science ===
- Andrew J. Moyer (M.S. 1925) – microbiologist and researcher at the USDA Northern Regional Research Laboratory
- Velva E. Rudd (MS 1932) – botanist; curator at the Smithsonian Institution's National Museum of Natural History
- Roy W. Simonson (BS 1934) – soil correlator for the Division of Soil Survey at the United States Department of Agriculture

=== Sports ===
- Josh Anderson – head football coach for Dakota State University
- Bob Backlund – professional wrestler
- Jeff Bentrim – professional football player; College Football Hall of Fame
- Chris Board – professional football player with the Detroit Lions, Baltimore Ravens, and New England Patriots.
- Gus Bradley – professional football coach with the Tennessee Titans and the Seattle Seahawks
- Taylor Braun – professional basketball player
- Tyrone Braxton – professional football player with the Denver Broncos
- Earl Bute – coach and athletic director at Wahpeton State Science School (now North Dakota State College of Science)
- Janet Cobbs – professional volleyball player and coach; bronze medalist with the United States women's national team at the 1992 Summer Olympics
- Joe Cutting – head football coach at North Dakota Agricultural College; mayor of Williston, North Dakota
- Craig Dahl – professional football player; winner of Super Bowl XLII
- Kyle Emanuel – professional football player with the San Diego Chargers
- Lamar Gordon – professional football player
- Joe Haeg – professional football player with the Tampa Bay Buccaneers, Pittsburgh Steelers, and Cleveland Browns; Super Bowl LV winner
- Phil Hansen – professional football player with the Buffalo Bills
- Kole Heckendorf – professional football player
- Ramon Humber – professional football player
- Rob Hunt – professional football player
- Joe Kittell – college basketball coach at the University of Mary Marauders
- Trey Lance – professional football player with the Los Angeles Chargers
- Doug Lloyd – professional football player with the Los Angeles Raiders
- Cody Mauch – professional football player Tampa Bay Buccaneers
- Joe Mays – professional football player with the Philadelphia Eagles, Denver Broncos, Houston Texans, Kansas City Chiefs and San Diego Chargers
- Clarence McGeary – professional football player
- Steve Nelson – football player with the New England Patriots; head coach at Curry College
- Sliv Nemzek – college football and basketball coach, mayor of Moorhead, Minnesota
- Amy Olson – professional golfer
- Payton Otterdahl – shot putter who competed in the 2020 Summer Olympics and the 2024 Summer Olympics.
- Dillon Radunz – professional football player with the New Orleans Saints and Tennessee Titans
- David Richman (BS 2002, MS 2005) – men's basketball head coach at North Dakota State University
- Stacy Robinson – professional football player with the New York Giants
- Tyler Roehl – professional football player and college football coach
- Nick Schommer – professonal football player
- Andre Smith – professional basketball player
- Amanda Smock – triple jumper; three-time NCAA Division II track and field champion
- Isaac Snell – professional football player with the New York Jets
- Chad Stark – professional football player
- Easton Stick – professional football player with the Tampa Bay Buccaneers
- Jamie Trachsel (MEd) – head coach of the Ole Miss Rebels softball team; co-head coach at North Dakota State University softball team
- Chris Tuchscherer – professional wrestler and mixed martial artist
- Billy Turner – professional football player
- Matt Veldman – professional football player
- Cordell Volson – professional football player
- Neil Wagner – professional baseball player
- Carson Wentz – professional football player with the Minnesota Vikings
- Brett Winkelman (2009) – professional basketball player
- Ben Woodside – professional basketball player

== Faculty and staff ==
- Thomas Ambrosio – professor in the Department of Political Science and Public Policy
- Anastassiya Andrianova – professor in the department of English
- Howard Bliss – former head football coach at the North Dakota Agricultural College
- Henry Luke Bolley – botanist and plant pathologist; one of the first three faculty members at North Dakota Agricultural College
- Stanley Borleske – former head football coach at the North Dakota Agricultural College
- Eddie Cochems – former head football coach at the North Dakota Agricultural College
- Ion Cortright – former head football coach and director of athletics at the North Dakota Agricultural College
- Joe Cutting – former head football coach at North Dakota Agricultural College
- David B. Danbom – professor of agricultural history at North Dakota State University from 1974 to 2010
- Paul J. Davis – former head football coach and athletic director at North Dakota Agricultural College
- Gil Dobie – former head football coach at North Dakota Agricultural College
- Casey Finnegan – former director of athletics at North Dakota Agricultural College
- Jay Fisher – director of the North Central Research Extension Center at North Dakota State University from 1994 to 2015; North Dakota House of Representatives
- Harold Henry Flor – plant pathologist and professor from 1931 to 1969
- Willet M. Hays – botanist; faculty of North Dakota Agricultural College from 1891 to1893; U. S. Assistant Secretary of Agriculture
- Ravindra Khattree – professor of mathematics
- Stan Kostka – former head football coach at North Dakota Agricultural College
- Edwin F. Ladd – dean of the school of chemistry and pharmacy and professor of chemistry at the North Dakota Agricultural College; college president from 1916 to 1921; United States Senate
- Jon Lindgren – chair of the Economics Department at North Dakota State University
- Richard Lyons – professor of English from 1950 to 1982; poet
- Paul Magoffin – athletic director and head football coach for the North Dakota Agricultural College
- A. L. Marshall – former head football coach at the North Dakota Agricultural College
- Daniel Q. Posin – former chairman of the physics department at North Dakota Agricultural College
- David Richman – men's basketball head coach at North Dakota State University
- Albert M. Ten Eyck – assistant professor of agriculture at the North Dakota Agricultural College
- Jamie Trachsel – co-head coach at North Dakota State University softball team
- John Watts – music instructor at North Dakota Agricultural College
- Mac Wenskunas – football coach at the North Dakota Agricultural College
- Howard Wood – former head football coach at the North Dakota Agricultural College
- Delaphine Grace Wyckoff – professor and microbiologist
- Albert F. Yeager – head of the Horticulture and Forestry Department of the North Dakota Agricultural College
