= Same-sex marriage in American Samoa =

Same-sex marriage is not currently performed in American Samoa, though same-sex marriages from other jurisdictions are recognized. On June 26, 2015, the U.S. Supreme Court ruled in Obergefell v. Hodges that the Fourteenth Amendment of the U.S. Constitution guarantees same-sex couples the right to marry. The ruling legalized same-sex marriage nationwide in the United States; however, it is uncertain how the ruling applies to American Samoa as the territory is unincorporated and unorganized. In July 2015, Governor Lolo Matalasi Moliga said he believed that the Supreme Court's ruling does not apply to American Samoa.

In 2022, the United States Congress passed the Respect for Marriage Act requiring all U.S. states and territories, including American Samoa, to recognize same-sex marriages performed in other jurisdictions.

== Legal history ==
=== Background ===
The American Samoa Code does not specify the sex of the parties to a marriage, but refers to the age of "the male" and "the female". It prescribes the use of a form in which the parties identify the parents to whom they are related as "son" or "daughter". In 2003, Representative Sua Carl Schuster introduced legislation to the American Samoa Fono to ban same-sex marriage. The measure was proposed a few years after the federal Defense of Marriage Act (DOMA; Samoan: Tulāfono o le Puipuiga o Faʻaipoipoga) was passed by the United States Congress and signed into law by President Bill Clinton. Schuster said he hoped to establish the territory's position clearly in order to avoid lawsuits like those in the mainland United States. Many supporters of the bill cited their Christian faith as their reason for supporting the proposal. The Senate defeated the measure in March 2003 when it opted to table the bill without taking any action, following testimony from Attorney General Fiti A. Sunia that "if it's not broken, don't fix it."

=== Supreme Court ruling ===
Recognition of same-sex relationships in Oceania Marriage Marriages performed elsewhere are recognized (American Samoa) No recognition of same-sex couples Constitution limits marriage to opposite-sex couples (Palau, Tuvalu) Same-sex sexual activity illegal, but criminalisation not enforced Same-sex sexual activity illegal (Country names will appear with mouse-overs when map is viewed at full size. Encircling lines are the exclusive economic zones of each state.)

It is uncertain how the U.S. Supreme Court's ruling in Obergefell v. Hodges applies to American Samoa as the territory is unorganized and unincorporated and its citizens are U.S. nationals by birth and not citizens. In July 2015, Attorney General Eleasalo Ale said that his office was "reviewing the decision to determine its applicability to American Samoa". A week later, Governor Lolo Matalasi Moliga said he believed that the Supreme Court's ruling does not apply to American Samoa. He said, "My personal opinion is, this ruling will not apply to our preamble, our constitution and our Christian values. Also, our political status is still unorganized and unincorporated, so the Supreme Court ruling does not apply to our territory." His stance was backed by the Assemblies of God, the Catholic Church, and the Church of Jesus Christ of Latter-day Saints. Howard Hills, writing for the Samoa News, noted that "[t]he U.S. Supreme Court long has held the U.S. Constitution does not apply by its own force in 'unincorporated' territories like American Samoa. This leaves exactly which 'fundamental rights' are applicable in not yet incorporated territories undefined, until determined by Congress and the courts on a case-by-case basis." Professor Rose Cuison Villazor at the University of California, Davis School of Law said that the court ruling "should not be questioned" in American Samoa, and that "the Supreme Court's decision was pretty strong. ... I would think there are cultural barriers to begin with. The AG might present some other legal and social barriers, too." Omar Gonzales-Pagan of Lambda Legal argued that the territories are required to comply due to the supremacy of federal law, and that same-sex marriage "... is a question of individual right, individual liberty." Chimene Keitner, an expert on territorial issues at the University of California, Hastings College of the Law, said that for same-sex marriage to be recognized in American Samoa, there needs to be a voluntary decision or litigation. Litigation would require "plaintiffs who have been denied the right to marry and are willing to take a public position on that and challenge their inability to marry. Plaintiffs could also be those who were married elsewhere and want the marriage recognized in American Samoa." Lambda Legal has called on any same-sex couple who has been denied a marriage license to contact them or the American Civil Liberties Union, the GLBTQ Legal Advocates & Defenders or the National Center for Lesbian Rights immediately for assistance.

In January 2016, Fiti Sunia was confirmed unanimously by the American Samoa Senate as the new district court judge. Asked about Obergefell during his confirmation hearing, he responded that he had not read the decision and that same-sex marriage fell outside the jurisdiction of the district court. He also said that he would not perform same-sex weddings in his new assignment unless the marriage statutes were changed.

In a 2022 essay, Chancellor's Professor of Law Christopher Leslie of the University of California, Irvine School of Law wrote of three theoretical routes for the legalization of same-sex marriage in American Samoa: the U.S. Congress could extend Obergefell to American Samoa, local leaders could acquiesce to Obergefell, or a local same-sex couple could file suit in federal court. However, American Samoa lacks a federal district court, and as a result such a lawsuit would likely be heard in Hawaii or in the District of Columbia. In addition, Leslie wrote, "The territory remains under the authority and supervision of the U.S. Department of the Interior, and, thus, it is unclear against whom same-sex couples hoping to enforce Obergefell in American Samoa would file suit. [...] [I]f the federal judge in Hawaii determines that the Secretary of the Interior is the proper respondent, an American Samoan couple seeking a marriage license could be forced to litigate 7,000 miles away in Washington, D.C. No other couple seeking marriage rights must bear such an extraordinary burden. Assuming that they can make it into the proper federal court, the couple then faces another unique legal problem—the Insular Cases." Leslie further wrote:

The hostility to marriage equality in American Samoa is painfully ironic, as its Polynesian culture has historically welcomed and embraced gender diversity. For centuries, Samoan society has recognized faʻafafine, who are members of American Samoa's traditional third gender. [...] The refusal to recognize Obergefell effectively blocks faʻafafine from marrying their male partners even though they would not be considered same-sex couples in traditional Polynesian culture because male and faʻafafine are different genders. [...] The denial of marriage rights inflicts significant harms and hardships upon same-sex couples and male-faʻafafine couples in American Samoa. Couples denied marriage rights may endure higher taxes, reduced access to healthcare, and more complicated and expensive legal planning. They also experience dignitary harms by being denied basic rights that others enjoy freely. [...] Marriage is more than just a bundle of rights; it is dignity, respect, and belonging. All these benefits and virtues are denied to same-sex and male-faʻafafine couples in American Samoa.

In a 2026 law review article, attorneys from American Samoa Legal Aid and the Freedom From Religion Foundation wrote that because the High Court of American Samoa had previously ruled that the Due Process Clause of the Fifth Amendment applies to the territory, and because same-sex marriage does not conflict with the core pillars of faʻa Sāmoa, the Supreme Court's ruling in Obergefell should apply to American Samoa. The article suggested that if a local same-sex couple were denied a marriage license the proper procedure would be to file a case against the Territorial Registrar in the High Court of American Samoa. If the High Court were to rule against the couple, the next step would be to sue the Department of the Interior.

=== Respect for Marriage Act ===
Under the Respect for Marriage Act (RFMA; Samoan: Tulāfono o le Faʻaaloalo mō Faʻaipoipoga) passed by the United States Congress in December 2022 and signed into law by President Joe Biden on December 13, 2022, all territories, including American Samoa, are required to recognize same-sex marriages performed legally in other jurisdictions. The law requires that same-sex and opposite-sex couples be treated equally. Christopher Leslie wrote in 2022 that "the RFMA is critically important in American Samoa precisely because Obergefell did not breach that territory's shores. [...] The RFMA brings a form of marriage equality to American Samoa for the first time."

== Historical and customary recognition ==
While there are no records of same-sex marriages being performed in Samoan culture in the way they are commonly defined in Western legal systems, local communities recognize identities and relationships that may be placed on the LGBT spectrum. Samoan culture recognizes people who occupy a third gender role in society. They are known as faʻafafine (Samoan pronunciation: [faʔafaˈfine]) and are considered an integral part of society. The faʻafafine are raised as girls from early childhood, wear women's clothing, and carry out women's work in the home and the community. Faʻafafine have sexual relationships exclusively with men who do not identify as faʻafafine, but historically if they wished to marry and have children they would marry women, all while continuing their "duties [...] and performing women's work". The faʻafafine status thus created the possibility for marriages between two female-presenting individuals to be performed in Samoan culture. Today, many faʻafafine have male partners.

== Public opinion ==
No opinion polls have gauged public support for same-sex marriage in American Samoa. The Samoa News reported in 2015 that the local LGBT community had welcomed the Supreme Court ruling. However, "they did not support it being done [performed] in the territory" according to the newspaper. A woman was reported as saying that she and her partner were going to get married off-island in the U.S. due to cultural sensitivity.

== See also ==
- LGBT rights in American Samoa
- Recognition of same-sex unions in Oceania
- Same-sex marriage in the United States
