= State attorney general =

Chief law enforcement official in a U.S. state or territory

Party affiliation of current United States attorneys general: Democratic (23 states, 1 territory, (Note: Attorneys general in the Northern Mariana Islands are elected non-partisan; however, Edward Manibusan affiliates with the Democratic Party) and 1 district) Republican (27 states, 1 territory (Note: Attorneys general in Guam are elected non-partisan; however, Doug Moylan affiliates with the Republican Party)) Non-partisan (2 territories) New Progressive (1 territory)

The state attorney general in each of the 50 U.S. states, of the federal district, or of any of the territories is the chief legal advisor to the state government and the state's chief law enforcement officer. The attorney general serves as the head of a state department of justice, department of law, or office of the attorney general, with responsibilities similar to those of the United States Department of Justice.

== History ==
The concept of a state attorney general originates with the attorneys general of the Thirteen Colonies, who in turn were modeled after the Attorney General for England and Wales. The first recorded appointment of an attorney general in the colonies was Virginia's appointment of Richard Lee I in 1643. The office may have existed for some time in a colony before it was recorded in official records. For example, Maryland was settled in 1634 but an attorney general is not mentioned in its records until 1658. In the colonial era, the office was poorly defined, and the pay was terrible and not commensurate to the scope and amount of work. The primitive state of statutory law in the colonies meant that practicing English law required a strong grasp of the common law to fill in the gaps. This was quite a problem when most of the people who actually understood the common law were still in England.

Of the 50 states in the Union, 34 states created or continued the office in their state constitution, eight others created the office in statutory law at the time of statehood, and eight others did not have an attorney general when they became states. A few states were slow to establish the office. Vermont's 1793 constitution mentions an attorney general but the legislature did not actually pass legislation to implement that constitutional provision until 1904. Some states went through the odd exercise of creating the office, abolishing it, then reestablishing it. Specifically, Illinois (1848–1867), Indiana (1826–1855), Maryland (1851–1864), and Massachusetts (1843–1849) all went through periods of disestablishing and reestablishing their state attorney general offices. All 50 states, the District of Columbia, and all the inhabited federal territories now have an attorney general or chief legal officer.

== Selection ==
The most prevalent method of selecting a state's attorney general is by popular election. 43 states have an elected attorney general. Elected attorneys general serve a four-year term, except in Vermont, where the term is two years.

Seven states do not popularly elect an attorney general. In Alaska, Hawaii, New Hampshire, New Jersey, and Wyoming, the attorney general is appointed by the governor. The attorney general in Tennessee is appointed by the Tennessee Supreme Court for an eight-year term. In Maine, the attorney general is elected by the state Legislature for a two-year term.

The District of Columbia and two U.S. territories, Guam and the Northern Mariana Islands, elect their attorneys general for a four-year term. 2014 marked the first year that the District of Columbia and the Northern Mariana Islands held an election for the office. In American Samoa, Puerto Rico, and the U.S. Virgin Islands, the attorney general is appointed by the governor. In Puerto Rico, the attorney general is officially called the secretary of justice, but is commonly known as the Puerto Rico attorney general.

Some states have passed term limits limiting the selection to 2 consecutive terms (9 states) or 2 terms maximum (4 states), but 33 states have no term limits.

== Duties ==
The specific duties of a state attorney general vary significantly from state to state, but there are several duties common to most offices:

- Control of litigation involving the state (representing the state at the trial and appellate levels in various types of litigation);
- Chief legal officer of the state (chief legal advisor to the governor and various state government agencies);
- Drafting advisory opinions on state law;
- Public advocacy (i.e., child support enforcement, consumer protection, state-level antitrust enforcement, utilities regulation, and crime victim advocacy);
- Criminal law enforcement (most attorneys general have relatively limited authority to initiate criminal prosecutions, but most are responsible for responding to defendants' appeals from prosecutions initiated in trial courts by locally elected district attorneys);
- Law reform (i.e., serving on a law reform commission);
- Exercising investigative authority (i.e., leading investigations of government misconduct, malfeasance, individual criminal activity, or issues of substantial public interest); and
- Setting public policy (invoking the authority of the statewide office as a platform to "speak with authority and influence on major questions" involving law and justice).

=== Defense of the state in federal lawsuits ===
State attorneys general enforce both state and federal laws. Because they are sworn to uphold the United States' constitution and laws as well as the state's, they may decline to defend a state law in a federal preemption case.

== Organization ==
According to the National Association of Attorneys General, two of the most common management models for organizing a state attorney general office are the chief deputy model and the multideputy cabinet model.

In the chief deputy model, the state attorney general delegates supervisory authority over all substantive divisions to a chief deputy attorney general, who acts as the de facto chief executive officer and presides over executive committee meetings.

In the multideputy cabinet model, there is no chief deputy. The office's substantive divisions are consolidated under a small number of first assistant or chief assistant attorneys general who together form the office's executive committee and function as a de facto cabinet to the state attorney general.

== Current attorneys general ==
The current party composition of the state attorneys general is:

- 23 Democrats
- 27 Republicans

The composition for the District of Columbia and the 5 populated territories is:

- 2 Democrats
- 1 Republican
- 2 Non-partisan
- 1 New Progressive

Rows of the attorney general table below are color coded indicating the political party of the office holder. The state names link to the position and list of officeholders.

Name	State	Party	Start	Term end	Law school	Term limits
Steve Marshall	Alabama	Republican	February 10, 2017	2026 (term limited)	University of Alabama, Tuscaloosa	Two consecutive
Cori Mills; Acting	Alaska	Republican	May 14, 2026	Appointed	University of the Pacific	None
Gwen Tauiliili-Langkilde	American Samoa	Nonpartisan	February 7, 2025	Appointed	University of Hawaii, Manoa	
Kris Mayes	Arizona	Democratic	January 2, 2023	2026	Arizona State University	Two consecutive
Tim Griffin	Arkansas	Republican	January 10, 2023	2026	Tulane University	Two lifetime
Rob Bonta	California	Democratic	April 23, 2021	2026	Yale University	Two lifetime
Phil Weiser	Colorado	Democratic	January 8, 2019	2026 (term limited)	New York University	Two consecutive
William Tong	Connecticut	Democratic	January 9, 2019	2026	University of Chicago	None
Kathy Jennings	Delaware	Democratic	January 1, 2019	2026	Villanova University	None
Brian Schwalb	District of Columbia	Democratic	January 2, 2023	2026	Harvard University	
James Uthmeier	Florida	Republican	February 17, 2025	2026	Georgetown University	Two consecutive
Chris Carr	Georgia	Republican	November 1, 2016	2026 (retiring)	Case Western Reserve University	None
Doug Moylan	Guam	Republican	January 2, 2023	2026 (defeated)	Santa Clara University	
Anne Lopez	Hawaii	Democratic	December 5, 2022	Appointed	University of Hawaii, Manoa	None
Raúl Labrador	Idaho	Republican	January 2, 2023	2026	University of Washington	None
Kwame Raoul	Illinois	Democratic	January 14, 2019	2026	Illinois Institute of Technology	None
Todd Rokita	Indiana	Republican	January 11, 2021	2028 (term limited)	Indiana University, Indianapolis	None
Brenna Bird	Iowa	Republican	January 3, 2023	2026 (defeated)	University of Chicago	None
Kris Kobach	Kansas	Republican	January 9, 2023	2026 (defeated)	Yale University	None
Russell Coleman	Kentucky	Republican	January 1, 2024	2027	University of Kentucky	Two consecutive
Liz Murrill	Louisiana	Republican	January 8, 2024	2027	Louisiana State University; Pepperdine University (LLM)	None
Aaron Frey	Maine	Democratic	January 2, 2019	2026 (Elected by the Legislature, term limited)	Roger Williams University	Four terms
Anthony Brown	Maryland	Democratic	January 3, 2023	2026	Harvard University	None
Andrea Campbell	Massachusetts	Democratic	January 18, 2023	2026	University of California, Los Angeles	None
Dana Nessel	Michigan	Democratic	January 1, 2019	2026 (term limited)	Wayne State University	Two lifetime
Keith Ellison	Minnesota	Democratic (DFL)	January 7, 2019	2026	University of Minnesota, Twin Cities	None
Lynn Fitch	Mississippi	Republican	January 9, 2020	2027 (retiring)	University of Mississippi, Oxford	None
Catherine Hanaway	Missouri	Republican	September 8, 2025	2028	Catholic University of America	None
Austin Knudsen	Montana	Republican	January 4, 2021	2028 (term limited)	University of Montana	Two terms in 16 years
Mike Hilgers	Nebraska	Republican	January 5, 2023	2026	University of Chicago	None
Aaron Ford	Nevada	Democratic	January 7, 2019	2026 (term limited)	Ohio State University, Columbus	Two lifetime
John Formella	New Hampshire	Republican	April 22, 2021	2028 (appointed)	George Washington University	None
Jennifer Davenport	New Jersey	Democratic	January 20, 2026	Appointed	Seton Hall University	None
Raúl Torrez	New Mexico	Democratic	January 1, 2023	2026	Stanford University	Two consecutive
Tish James	New York	Democratic	January 1, 2019	2026	Howard University	None
Jeff Jackson	North Carolina	Democratic	January 1, 2025	2028	University of North Carolina, Chapel Hill	None
Drew Wrigley	North Dakota	Republican	February 9, 2022	2026	American University	None
Ed Manibusan	Northern Mariana Islands	Democratic	January 13, 2015	2026 (retiring)	Gonzaga University	
Andy Wilson	Ohio	Republican	June 7, 2026	2026 (retiring)	University of Dayton	Two consecutive
Gentner Drummond	Oklahoma	Republican	January 9, 2023	2026 (retiring)	Georgetown University	Two lifetime
Dan Rayfield	Oregon	Democratic	December 31, 2024	2028	Willamette University	None
Dave Sunday	Pennsylvania	Republican	January 21, 2025	2028	Widener University (Delaware)	Two consecutive
Lourdes Gómez	Puerto Rico	New Progressive	May 27, 2025	Appointed	Pontifical Catholic University of Puerto Rico	
Peter Neronha	Rhode Island	Democratic	January 1, 2019	2026 (term limited)	Boston College	Two consecutive
Alan Wilson	South Carolina	Republican	January 12, 2011	2026 (retiring)	University of South Carolina, Columbia	None
Marty Jackley	South Dakota	Republican	January 3, 2023	2026 (retiring)	University of South Dakota	Two consecutive
Jonathan Skrmetti	Tennessee	Republican	September 1, 2022	2030 (Elected by State Supreme Court)	Harvard University	None
Ken Paxton	Texas	Republican	January 5, 2015; Suspended: May 27, 2023 – September 16, 2023	2026 (retiring)	University of Virginia	None
Gordon Rhea	U.S. Virgin Islands	Nonpartisan	April 29, 2024	Appointed	Stanford University	
Derek Brown	Utah	Republican	January 6, 2025	2028	Pepperdine University	None
Charity Clark	Vermont	Democratic	January 5, 2023	2026	Boston College	None
Jay Jones	Virginia	Democratic	January 17, 2026	2029	University of Virginia	None
Nick Brown	Washington	Democratic	January 15, 2025	2028	Harvard University	None
JB McCuskey	West Virginia	Republican	January 13, 2025	2028	West Virginia University	None
Josh Kaul	Wisconsin	Democratic	January 7, 2019	2026	Stanford University	None
Keith Kautz	Wyoming	Republican	July 7, 2025	Appointed	University of Wyoming	None

== See also ==
- State constitutional officer (United States)
- National Association of Attorneys General
- List of U.S. statewide elected officials
