= Grover J. Rees III =

American attorney, diplomat and law professor

Grover Joseph Rees III
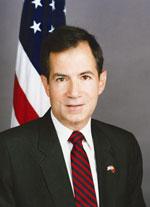

United States Ambassador to East Timor
- In office 2003–2006
- President: George W. Bush
- Preceded by: Shari Villarosa
- Succeeded by: W. Gary Gray

Associate Justice of the American Samoa High Court
- In office 1988–1991
- Appointed by: Donald P. Hodel
- Preceded by: F. Michael Kruse
- Succeeded by: Lyle L. Richmond

Chief Justice of the American Samoa High Court
- In office 1986–1988
- Appointed by: William P. Clark Jr.
- Preceded by: Thomas W. Murphy
- Succeeded by: F. Michael Kruse

Personal details
- Born: October 11, 1951 (age 75) New Orleans, Louisiana
- Party: Republican
- Spouse(s): (1) Divorced (2) Landai Nguyen Rees
- Children: Grover J. Reese, IV from first marriage
- Education: Yale University; Louisiana State University Law School
- Occupation: Attorney; Diplomat; Law professor

Grover Joseph Rees III (born October 11, 1951) is a Louisiana lawyer who served as chief justice of the High Court of American Samoa from 1986 to 1991, and as the first United States Ambassador to East Timor from 2002 to 2006.

== Early life, education, and career ==
Born in New Orleans, Rees was the oldest of twelve children born to Grover Joseph Rees II and Patricia Byrne Rees. Rees graduated from Georgetown Preparatory School in 1968, and thereafter received an undergraduate degree from Yale University, and a Juris Doctor from the Louisiana State University Paul M. Hebert Law Center in 1978. At Yale, Rees was a member of the Calliopean Society. From 1978 to 1979, he served as a law clerk to Albert Tate Jr. of the Louisiana Supreme Court.

Rees was a law professor at the University of Texas School of Law from 1979 to 1986.

== Political activities ==
Rees served as chief justice and associate justice of the High Court of American Samoa from 1986 to 1991, having served under appointment from both Presidents Ronald Reagan and George H. W. Bush. From 2001 to 2002, Rees served as the Counsel to the United States House of Representatives Committee on International Relations. In 2002, President George W. Bush nominated Rees as the first United States Ambassador to East Timor. Rees presented his credentials to the president of the Democratic Republic of East Timor, Kay Rala Xanana Gusmão in December 2002, and thereafter served for four years. From October 2006 to January 2009, he was a Special Representative for Social Issues in the United States Department of State.

In 2016, Rees was a candidate in the 2016 United States House of Representatives elections in Louisiana, for Louisiana's 3rd congressional district. He was endorsed by former Mayor of Lafayette Dud Lastrapes, and former United States Ambassador to the United Nations John Bolton, but received less than one percent of the vote in a crowded jungle primary.

In 2017, Rees was one of a group of 25 international figures who released a joint statement describing the 2017 imprisonment of Hong Kong democracy activists as "outrageously unjust". The signatories called the Umbrella Movement "one of the most peaceful and restrained movements of public protest the world has ever seen" and wrote that the sentencing amounted to "an outrageous miscarriage of justice, a death knell for Hong Kong’s rule of law and basic human rights, and a severe blow to the principles of 'One Country, Two Systems'".
