= Gwen Tauiliili-Langkilde =

American Samoan judge (born 1960)

19th Attorney General of American Samoa
- Incumbent
- Assumed office February 7, 2025; Acting: February 7, 2025 – February 13, 2025
- Governor: Nikolao Pula
- Preceded by: Fainu'ulelei Alailima-Utu

Judge of the American Samoa District Court
- In office February 17, 2021 – February 7, 2025
- Appointed by: Lemanu Peleti Mauga
- Preceded by: Fiti A. Sunia
- Succeeded by: Vacant

Personal details
- Education: University of Hawaii, Manoa (BA, JD)

Gwen Tauiliili-Langkilde is an American lawyer who has served as the 19th Attorney General of American Samoa since 2025. She previously served as a judge of the District Court of American Samoa from 2021 to 2025.

== Early life and education ==
Tauiliili-Langkilde is a native of American Samoa and earned a bachelor's degree with distinction in political science from the University of Hawaiʻi at Mānoa in 1992 and a Juris Doctor degree from the William S. Richardson School of Law in 1996.

== Career ==
Tauiliili-Langkilde returned to American Samoa after law school. She served as a law clerk to Chief Justice F. Michael Kruse of the High Court of American Samoa. Her career has included serving as assistant legal counsel to Governors A. P. Lutali and Tauese Sunia, private practice, serving as general counsel to the American Samoa Telecommunications Authority, and serving as Deputy Attorney General of American Samoa.

In 2021, Tauiliili-Langkilde was appointed as a judge of the District Court of American Samoa by Governor Lemanu Peleti Mauga. She was confirmed by the American Samoa Senate on February 17, 2021. She notably held that the Second Amendment to the United States Constitution does not apply to American Samoa.

On February 7, 2025, Governor Pulaali'i Nikolao Pula appointed Tauiliili-Langkilde as Acting Attorney General of American Samoa. She was confirmed by the Senate on February 13, 2025.

Legal offices
Preceded by Fainu'ulelei Alailima-Utu	Attorney General of American Samoa; 2025–present	Incumbent
