= Alailima =

Alailima is a surname. Notable people with the surname include:

- Leiataualesa Vaiao Alailima (1921–2016), Samoan politician
- Fainu'ulelei Alailima-Utu, American Samoan lawyer
