= Mauga =

Mauga may refer to:

- Mauga, Samoa, a village in Savai'i island in Samoa.
- Mauga (Overwatch), a fictional character from the Overwatch franchise
- Mauga Palepoi (died 1963), American Samoan chief and politician
- Joshua Mauga (born 1987), American football player
- Lemanu Peleti Mauga (born 1949), American politician and governor of American Samoa
