= Fiti A. Sunia =

American Samoan judge (born 1960)

Fiti Sunia

Associate Justice of the American Samoa High Court
- Incumbent
- Assumed office January 4, 2019
- Appointed by: David Bernhardt
- Preceded by: Lyle Richmond

Judge of the American Samoa District Court
- In office January 15, 2016 – January 4, 2019
- Appointed by: Lolo Moliga
- Preceded by: John Ward
- Succeeded by: Gwen Tauiliili-Langkilde

13th Attorney General of American Samoa
- In office January 1, 2002 – December 31, 2004
- Governor: Tauese Sunia; Togiola Tulafono
- Preceded by: Toetagata Albert Mailo
- Succeeded by: Malaetasi Togafau

Personal details
- Born: Fiti Alesana Sunia; August 29, 1960 (age 65) Honolulu, Hawaii, U.S.
- Relatives: Fofō Sunia (father); Tauese Sunia (uncle); Faoa Sunia (uncle)
- Education: Drake University (BA); American University (MPA); Howard University (JD)

Fiti Alesana Sunia (born August 29, 1960) is an American lawyer who has served as the associate justice of the High Court of American Samoa since 2019.

== Early life and education ==
Sunia was born on August 29, 1960, in Honolulu, Hawaii. He attended Samoana High School in Utulei, American Samoa before finishing high school at Mid-Pacific Institute in Honolulu.

Sunia earned his bachelor's degree in public administration from Drake University and, in 1983, earned a master's degree in public administration from American University. He earned his J.D. from Howard University in 1993.

== Career ==
After earning his master's degree, Sunia worked as a Congressional staffer to U.S. Representative Mervyn Dymally of California.

Sunia began his legal career at Patton Boggs in Washington, D.C. from 1993 to 1997. He returned to American Samoa in 1997, joining the territory's attorney general office. From 2002 to 2004, Sunia served as the Attorney General of American Samoa. He then started his own private practice in American Samoa.

On January 15, 2016, Sunia was confirmed by the American Samoa Senate as a judge of the District Court of American Samoa.

On January 4, 2019, United States Secretary of the Interior David Bernhardt appointed Sunia as the associate justice of the High Court of American Samoa. Chief Justice F. Michael Kruse serves alongside Sunia.

== Personal life ==
Sunia's father, Fofō Sunia, served as the first non-voting Delegate from American Samoa to the United States House of Representatives. His uncle, Tauese Sunia, was the fifth elected Governor of American Samoa.

Sunia carries the matai titles of Muagutitia in Pu'apu'a, Samoa and Faga in Alao, American Samoa.

Legal offices
Preceded by Toetagata Albert Mailo	Attorney General of American Samoa; 2002–2004	Succeeded by Malaetasi Togafau
Preceded by Lyle Richmond	Associate Justice of the American Samoa High Court; 2019–present	Incumbent
