= Ashaolu (surname) =

West Africa origin surname list

Ashaolu is a surname of West Africa origin. Notable people with the surname include:

- Olu Ashaolu (born April 18, 1988) Nigerian-Canadian basketball player
- Sam Ashaolu (born December 25, 1982) American basketball player
