= Fainu'ulelei S. Utu =

American Samoan politician (1924–1974)

Speaker of the House of Representatives
- In office 1969–1970

Member of the Senate
- In office 1973–1974

Member of the House of Representatives
- In office 1969–1973

Personal details
- Born: August 4, 1924
- Died: March 6, 1974 (aged 49)
- Party: Republican
- Children: Fainu'ulelei Alailima-Utu

Fainu'ulelei S. Utu (August 4, 1924 – March 6, 1974) was an American Samoan politician. He served as Speaker of the House of Representatives (1969–1970) and a member of the Fono legislature as both a member in the House of Representatives (1969–1973) and the Senate (1973–1974).

== Personal life ==
Utu was raised in both Amouli and Fagatogo as his family owned a second home in Fagatogo. He suffered from a variety of illnesses throughout his life and did not finish high school with his peers due to lung disease. Upon graduating high school, Utu attended Suva Medical School in Fiji. He later worked as a teacher.

He had one daughter and two sons with his wife Penelope Alaiilima. He was a member of two church communities: he was the deacon in the Congregational Christian Church in Amouli, and he was a lay preacher at the Methodist Church in Fagatogo.

== Career ==
When Utu returned from Fiji upon graduating medical school, he ran and won against incumbent A. P. Lutali for the House of Representatives, but left for the University of Hawaiʻi after serving one term. Upon graduating from the University of Hawai'i, Utu was hired by Governor Peter Tali Coleman to work in the Governor's Office in 1959. In 1961 he transferred to the Department of Administrative Services and later the Department of Agriculture. He also established a poultry farm in his hometown of Amouli.

He ran for the House of Representatives in 1968 and served as Speaker of the House in the 11th and 12th Legislature. He later received the high chief title "Utu" and the family title of "Fainu'ulelei". He was elected to the Senate in 1972, but served less than two years of his four-year term due to illness. He died on March 6, 1974.
