= Palepoi =

Palepoi is a Samoan surname. Notable people with the surname include:

- Anton Palepoi (born 1978), American football player, brother of Tenny Palepoi
- Opeta Palepoi (born 1975), Samoan rugby union player
- Tenny Palepoi (born 1990), American football player, brother of Anton Palepoi
- Mauga Palepoi (died 1963), American Samoan politician
