= Joe Kittell =

American college basketball coach

Biographical details
- Education: North Dakota State

Coaching career (HC unless noted)
- 2002–2006: North Dakota State (SA)
- 2006–2007: Mayville State (assistant)
- 2007–2008: NDSCS (assistant)
- 2008–2009: Breckenridge High (assistant)
- 2009–2010: Colorado State (assistant)
- 2010–2013: Gillette College (assistant)
- 2013–2015: Lake Region
- 2015–2021: Mary

Head coaching record
- Overall: 107–116

Accomplishments and honors

Awards
- Samaritan's Feet Coach of the Year (2017)

Joe Kittell is an American college basketball coach, formerly the head coach for the University of Mary Marauders.

A native of Garrison, North Dakota, Kittell began his coaching career as a student assistant at North Dakota State University from 2002 to 2006. He was then hired at Mayville State University and spent only one season there before leaving for the North Dakota State College of Science, but again was only there for one season. From there, he went to Breckenridge High School (Minnesota) where he was the assistant boys' basketball coach. While there he also directed Every Child's Important (ECI) Youth Services, a non-profit organization that runs summer traveling basketball teams in South Dakota, North Dakota, and Minnesota.

During the 2009–10 season, Kittell was the a video coordinator at Colorado State University in Fort Collins, Colorado. Afterwards, he was hired as an assistant coach at Gillette College for three years.

In 2013, Kittell was hired to his first head coaching job at Lake Region State College in Devils Lake, North Dakota. During his two seasons there, he led the Royals to a record of 42–20.

Kittell was hired as the head coach of the University of Mary in Bismarck, North Dakota on April 16, 2015.

After the 2020–21 season, Kittell stepped down as the head coach of the Marauders and was replaced by Jack Nelson.

He currently serves as the Director of Undergraduate Admissions at the University of Mary

== Samaritan's Feet ==
In 2017, Kittell was named as the Samaritan's Feet Coach of the Year.

== Head coaching record ==
Record table
Season	Team	Overall	Conference	Standing	Postseason
Lake Region (Mon-Dak Conference) (2013–2015)
2013–14	Lake Region	19–12			
2014–15	Lake Region	23–8			
Lake Region:		42–20 (.677)			
Mary (NSIC) (2015–2021)
2015–16	Mary	19–12	12–10	6th	
2016–17	Mary	12–17	10–12	T-8th	
2017–18	Mary	6–21	4–18	T-15th	
2018–19	Mary	12–17	9–13	T-10th	
2019–20	Mary	12–17	7–15	6th	
2020–21	Mary	4–12	4–10	13th	
Mary:		65–96 (.404)	46–78 (.371)		
Total:		107–116 (.480)			
National champion Postseason invitational champion Conference regular season champion Conference regular season and conference tournament champion Division regular season champion Division regular season and conference tournament champion Conference tournament champion
