= Michael Kruse (judge) =

American Samoan judge

Chief Justice of the American Samoa High Court
- Incumbent
- Assumed office November 1, 1988
- Appointed by: Donald P. Hodel
- Preceded by: Grover J. Rees III

Associate Justice of the American Samoa High Court
- In office March 1, 1987 – November 1, 1988
- Appointed by: Donald P. Hodel
- Preceded by: Thomas Murphy
- Succeeded by: Grover J. Rees III

Personal details
- Born: Lealaialoa Fredrickus Michael Kruse; January 27, 1948 (age 78) Utulei, American Samoa
- Education: Victoria University of Wellington (BA, LLB); George Washington University (MCL)

Lealaialoa Fredrickus Michael Kruse (born January 27, 1948) is the Chief Justice of the High Court of American Samoa. Kruse made history as the first person of Samoan descent to be appointed Chief Justice of the High Court of American Samoa. Kruse earned his Bachelor of Arts and Bachelor of Laws degree from Victoria University in Wellington, New Zealand, and later obtained an Master of Comparative Law degree from George Washington University Law School in Washington, DC. He practiced law for 11 years at the firm of Kruse, Sunia, and Ward in Pago Pago before being appointed Chief Justice by U.S. Secretary of the Interior, Donald Hodel. In January 2009, Kruse was chosen to serve as Secretary of the Pacific Judicial Council, a group comprising judges and justices from across the Pacific region.

== Early life and education ==
Born in Utulei and raised in Leone, his early life was marked by diverse work experiences, including roles as a planter, hog farmer, construction laborer, delivery vendor, stevedore, carpenter, baker, retailer, warehouseman, and corporate officer. He was the son of Masoe Fritz Kruse, a Member of Parliament, and Peleiupu Aigamaua Kruse. From a young age, Kruse was actively involved in his parents' business ventures, which included farming, merchandising, and management.

Kruse’s education began in Leone and continued in Apia, Western Samoa, before he attended high school in Auckland, New Zealand. He earned his bachelor’s and law degrees from Victoria University in Wellington and pursued post-graduate studies at the National Law Center of George Washington University in Washington, DC, where he obtained a Master of Comparative Law degree. During his time in DC, he also worked part-time in the office of A. U. Fuimaono, the first delegate from American Samoa to the U.S. Congress.

Upon returning to American Samoa, Kruse practiced law in both Apia and Pago Pago as part of the Kruse & Kruse law firm. In 1985, he partnered with John Ward and Aitofele Sunia to form a new legal practice. Kruse was a member of the bar associations in the District of Columbia, American Samoa, Western Samoa, and New Zealand. He also served as Vice President and President of the American Samoa Bar Association. Between 1979 and 1985, he held the position of Judge Pro Tempore at the newly established District Court of American Samoa.

Kruse's judicial career advanced when he was appointed Associate Justice of the High Court of American Samoa on March 1, 1987. On November 1, 1988, Interior Secretary Donald P. Hodel appointed him Chief Justice, making Kruse the first Samoan to hold this position. He is the registered holder of the Leone orator matai title, Lealaialoa. Kruse married Gail Brunt-Meredith of Apia, and they have three children together.

== Career ==
Kruse practiced law in American Samoa as an attorney from 1985 until his appointment as an associate justice of the High Court of American Samoa in 1987. He was then appointed as Chief Justice of American Samoa in 1988. The Chief Justice is the head of the High Court of American Samoa.

== Personal life ==
His eldest son, Vincent Kruse, is a lawyer practicing in Hawaii.

Legal offices
Preceded by Thomas Murphy	Associate Justice of the American Samoa High Court; 1987–1988	Succeeded by Grover J. Rees III
Preceded by Grover J. Rees III	Chief Justice of the American Samoa High Court; 1988–present	Incumbent
