= 2011 ACB Playoffs =

The 2011 ACB Playoffs was the final phase of the 2010–11 ACB season. It started on May 19, 2011, and will end in June 2011. Caja Laboral were the current title holders, but were eliminated by Regal FC Barcelona in semifinals. Regal FC Barcelona won their 16th title.

== Bracket ==
Quarter Finals
1	Regal FC Barcelona	2
8	Unicaja	0
4	Caja Laboral	2
5	Gran Canaria 2014	0
2	Real Madrid	2
7	B. Fuenlabrada	0
3	PE Valencia	0
6	Bilbao Basket	2

Semifinals
1	Regal FC Barcelona	3
4	Caja Laboral	0
2	Real Madrid	1
6	Bilbao Basket	3

Finals
1	Regal FC Barcelona	3
6	Bilbao Basket	0

== Quarterfinals ==
The quarterfinals are best-of-3 series.

=== Regal FC Barcelona vs. Unicaja ===
May 19
20:30 CEST

Report

Regal FC Barcelona	76–65	Unicaja
Scoring by quarter: 16–12, 21–23, 21–8, 18–22
Pts: Navarro 17; Rebs: three players 5 Asts: Sada 5		Pts: Tripković 13; Rebs: Garbajosa 8 Asts: Freeland 4
1–0

Palau Blaugrana, Barcelona
Attendance: 4,327
Referees: De la Maza, Conde, Parea

May 21
18:00 CEST

Report

Unicaja	52–84	Regal FC Barcelona
Scoring by quarter: 6–17, 14–17, 18–26, 14–24
Pts: Freeland 14; Rebs: Freeland 8 Asts: three players 2		Pts: Morris 13; Rebs: Morris 6 Asts: Rubio 7
Regal FC Barcelona wins series 2–0

Martín Carpena Arena, Málaga
Attendance: 11,000
Referees: Martín Bertrán, García González, Jiménez Trujillo

=== Caja Laboral vs. Gran Canaria 2014 ===
May 20
20:30 CEST

Report

Caja Laboral	86–82	Gran Canaria 2014
Scoring by quarter: 30–23, 19–18, 17–18, 20–23
Pts: Teletović 27; Rebs: San Emeterio 7 Asts: Huertas 7		Pts: Nelson, Moran 15; Rebs: Wallace, Beirán 7 Asts: Bellas 6
1–0

Fernando Buesa Arena, Vitoria-Gasteiz
Attendance: 9,400
Referees: Xavier Amorós, M.A. Pérez Pérez, J.J. Martínez Díez

May 22
12:30 CEST

Report

Gran Canaria 2014	76–93	Caja Laboral
Scoring by quarter: 2824, 15–17, 16–20, 17–32
Pts: Carroll 17; Rebs: Wallace 6 Asts: Nelson 6		Pts: Oleson 21; Rebs: Barać 11; Asts: Huertas 8
Caja Laboral wins series 2–0

Centro Insular de Deportes, Las Palmas de Gran Canaria
Attendance: 5,025
Referees: Daniel Hierrezuelo, Antonio Conde, Carlos Peruga

=== Real Madrid vs. Baloncesto Fuenlabrada ===
May 20
20:30 CEST

Report

Real Madrid	93–72	Baloncesto Fuenlabrada
Scoring by quarter: 20–27, 28–19, 22–13, 23–13
Pts: Llull 21; Rebs: Reyes 6 Asts: Prigioni 4		Pts: Kus 11; Rebs: Valters 5 Asts: Valters 6
1–0

Caja Mágica, Madrid
Attendance: 6,938
Referees: Pérez Pizarro, García Ortiz, Peruga

May 22
12:15 CEST

Report

Baloncesto Fuenlabrada	55–68	Real Madrid
Scoring by quarter: 16–18, 10–18, 18–19, 11–13
Pts: three players 12; Rebs: Ayón 15; Asts: Valters 5		Pts: Llull 16; Rebs: Fischer 9 Asts: Prigioni 4
Real Madrid wins series 2–0

Polideportivo Fernando Martin, Fuenlabrada
Attendance: 5,613
Referees: Juan Carlos Arteaga, Oscar Perea, C Sánchez Monserrat

=== Power Electronics Valencia vs. Bilbao Basket ===
May 20
20:30 CEST

Report

Power Electronics Valencia	72–79	Bilbao Basket
Scoring by quarter: 13–17, 24–29, 16–18, 19–15
Pts: Martínez, Savanović 16; Rebs: Javtokas 11; Asts: Savanović 3		Pts: Mavroeidis, Hernández-Sonseca 12; Rebs: Mavroeidis 8 Asts: Jackson, Vasileiadis 4
0–1

Pabellon Municipal Fuente San Luis, Valencia
Attendance: 8,000
Referees: Redondo, Vicente Bultó, Francisco J. Araña

May 22
12:30 CEST

Report

Bilbao Basket	79–75	Power Electronics Valencia
Scoring by quarter: 27–23, 14–22, 16–11, 22–19
Pts: Blūms 16; Rebs: Hervelle 9 Asts: Jackson 7		Pts: Savanović 16; Rebs: Javtokas 8 Asts: Cook 5
Bizkaia Bilbao Basket wins series 2–0

Bilbao Arena, Bilbao
Attendance: 7,014
Referees: Juan Carlos Mitjana, Lluis Guirao, Carlos Cortés

== Semifinals ==
The semifinals are best-of-5 series.

=== Regal FC Barcelona vs. Caja Laboral ===
May 27
20:00 CEST

Report

Regal FC Barcelona	86–71	Caja Laboral
Scoring by quarter: 18–19, 22–22, 32–20, 14–10
Pts: four players 17; Rebs: Lorbek 10; Asts: Navarro 6		Pts: Teletović 23; Rebs: San Emeterio 7 Asts: Huertas 6
1–0

Palau Blaugrana, Barcelona
Attendance: 4,886
Referees: Hierrezuelo, Redondo, Francisco J. Araña

May 29
12:30 CEST

Report

Regal FC Barcelona	78–62	Caja Laboral
Scoring by quarter: 18–19, 19–10, 16–18, 25–15
Pts: Anderson 12; Rebs: Sada 7 Asts: Sada 5		Pts: San Emeterio 14; Rebs: Barać 9 Asts: Huertas 6
2–0

Palau Blaugrana, Barcelona
Attendance: 4,557
Referees: Pérez Pizarro, García Ortiz, Jiménez Trujillo

June 1
20:30 CEST

Caja Laboral	61–71	Regal FC Barcelona
Scoring by quarter: 16–20, 15–15, 17–18, 13–18
Pts: San Emeterio 14; Rebs: Batista 9 Asts: Huertas 5		Pts: Navarro 13; Rebs: Sada 7 Asts: Sada, Lakovič 4
Regal FC Barcelona wins series 3–0

Fernando Buesa Arena, Vitoria-Gasteiz
Attendance: 9,500
Referees: Arteaga, Bultó, Peruga

=== Real Madrid vs. Bilbao Basket ===
May 27
21:45 CEST

Report

Real Madrid	78–67	Bilbao Basket
Scoring by quarter: 18–15, 19–14, 19–19, 22–19
Pts: Llull 20; Rebs: Reyes 10; Asts: Reyes 4		Pts: Banić 18; Rebs: Banić 7 Asts: Jackson, Mumbrú 3
1–0

Caja Mágica, Madrid
Attendance: 7,988
Referees: E. Pérez Pizarro, Antonio Conde, Lluis Guirao

May 29
20:30 CEST

Report

Real Madrid	66–71	Bilbao Basket
Scoring by quarter: 14–19, 11–25, 20–6, 21–21
Pts: Llull 20; Rebs: Suárez 8 Asts: Prigioni 5		Pts: Jackson, Mumbrú 13; Rebs: Hervelle 11; Asts: Jackson 5
1–1

Caja Mágica, Madrid
Attendance: 7,821
Referees: J.A. Martín Bertrán, Oscar Perea, Carlos Cortés

May 31
20:30 CEST

Report

Bilbao Basket	68–51	Real Madrid
Scoring by quarter: 22–13, 11–8, 15–19, 20–11
Pts: Banić 13; Rebs: Banić 11; Asts: Jackson 4		Pts: Rodríguez 18; Rebs: Tomić 8 Asts: Tomić, Suárez 1
2–1

Bilbao Arena, Bilbao
Attendance: 8,510
Referees: Amorós, Pérez Pérez, Jiménez Trujillo

June 2
20:30 CEST

Report

Bilbao Basket	80–72	Real Madrid
Scoring by quarter: 19–20, 19–21, 16–14, 26–17
Pts: Jackson 17; Rebs: Jackson, Hervelle 6 Asts: Mumbrú 3		Pts: Tomić 17; Rebs: Tomić 6 Asts: Rodríguez 3
Bizkaia Bilbao wins series 3–1

Bilbao Arena, Bilbao
Attendance: 8,682
Referees: Martín Bertrán, Hierrezuelo, Conde

== Finals ==
The finals are best-of-5 series.

=== Regal FC Barcelona vs Bilbao Basket ===
June 9
20:45 CEST

Report (in Spanish)

Regal FC Barcelona	74–64	Bilbao Basket
Scoring by quarter: 26–12, 17–19, 21–9, 10–24
Pts: Lorbek 24; Rebs: N'Dong 10; Asts: Rubio 4		Pts: Warren 12; Rebs: Hervelle 9 Asts: Fisher 4
1–0

Palau Blaugrana, Barcelona
Attendance: 6,821
Referees: Hierrezuelo, Redondo, Jiménez

June 11
18:15 CEST

Report (in Spanish)

Regal FC Barcelona	74–67	Bilbao Basket
Scoring by quarter: 14–11, 26–20, 14–9, 20–27
Pts: Navarro 20; Rebs: Perović 7 Asts: Navarro, Sada 4		Pts: Vasileiadis, Blūms 15; Rebs: Hervelle 10; Asts: Mumbrú 4
2–0

Palau Blaugrana, Barcelona
Attendance: 6,902
Referees: Martín Bertrán, García Ortiz, García González

June 14
20:45 CEST

Report (in Spanish)

Bilbao Basket	55–64	Regal FC Barcelona
Scoring by quarter: 19–12, 10–18, 18–18, 8–16
Pts: Mumbrú 14; Rebs: Hervelle 7 Asts: Warren 2		Pts: Navarro 16; Rebs: Sada 8 Asts: Navarro, Sada 4
Regal FC Barcelona wins series 3–0

Bilbao Arena, Bilbao
Attendance: 8,682
Referees: Juan Carlos Arteaga, E. Pérez Pizarro, Antonio Conde

ACB Finals MVP: (Spain) Juan Carlos Navarro

2011 ACB League
FC Barcelona
16th Title
