= Afa Ripley Jr. =

American Samoan lawyer

Fepulea’i Afa Ripley Jr.

Attorney General of American Samoa
- In office 2 May 2007 – 17 January 2013
- Governor: Togiola Tulafono
- Preceded by: Malaetasi Togafau
- Succeeded by: Afoa Moega Lutu

Personal details
- Born: January 20, 1949 (age 77) Leone

Fepulea’i Afa Ripley Jr. is a former Attorney General of American Samoa. Governor Togiola Tulafono appointed him to succeed Malaetasi Togafau, who died on March 9, 2007, and he was approved by the Fono, or legislature. Ripley is an alumnus of California Western School of Law, and was chairman of the board of the American Samoa Power Authority prior to his appointment.

== Career ==
Ripley began his law career after graduating from California Western School of Law in San Diego and passing the Hawaii State Bar in 1978. His legal work took him to Honolulu, where he served in several high-profile positions, including working for the State Attorney General’s Department, the Prosecuting Attorney’s office, and the City Corporation Council's office. In 1982, he transitioned into private practice. During his time as a prosecutor in Honolulu, Ripley earned recognition for his efficiency. He was particularly well-known for securing one of the fastest murder convictions in the history of the state. Ripley is also known for his community involvement, particularly through his television program, Samoa I Hawaii, which he produced alongside his wife, Marie. The program aired on Sunday nights on Channel 20 and provided coverage of various cultural events, immigration issues, social and health services, and other matters of interest to the Samoan community in Hawai'i.
