= Aaron Jackson (basketball) =

American basketball player (born 1986)

Personal information
- Born: May 6, 1986 (age 40) Hartford, Connecticut, U.S.
- Listed height: 6 ft 3 in (1.91 m)
- Listed weight: 183 lb (83 kg)

Career information
- High school: Northwest Catholic (West Hartford, Connecticut); Worcester Academy (Worcester, Massachusetts)
- College: Duquesne (2005–2009)
- NBA draft: 2009: undrafted
- Playing career: 2009–2020
- Position: Point guard / shooting guard
- Number: 5, 7, 9, 55, 6

Career history
- 2009–2010: Antalya BB
- 2010: Virtus Bologna
- 2010–2012: Bilbao Basket
- 2012–2017: CSKA Moscow
- 2017–2018: Beijing Ducks
- 2018: Houston Rockets
- 2018–2019: Beijing Ducks
- 2019: Zhejiang Lions
- 2020: Maccabi Tel Aviv

Career highlights
- EuroLeague champion (2016); 5× VTB United League champion (2013–2017); 5× Russian League champion (2013–2017); 4× Gomelsky Cup champion (2013–2016); All-Spanish League Third Team (2012); First-team All-Atlantic 10 (2009); Atlantic 10 Most Improved Player (2009)
- Stats at NBA.com
- Stats at Basketball Reference

Aaron Lee Jackson (born May 6, 1986) is an American former professional basketball player. Standing at 191 cm (6 ft 3 in), ,he plays at both the point guard and shooting guard positions, with point guard being his main position.

He has played professionally in Europe and China, since finishing his collegiate career with Duquesne, earning plaudits for his play and achievements, most notably while with the Spanish club Bilbao Basket and the Russian club CSKA Moscow.

== High school ==
Jackson attended and played high school basketball at Northwest Catholic High School, in West Hartford, Connecticut, and at Worcester Academy, in Worcester, Massachusetts.

He won two Connecticut state championships while at Northwest Catholic High School, and spent a year at Worcester Academy prep school, for his postgraduate year. While playing under head coach Mo Cassara at the second, he was recruited by NCAA Division I program Duquesne, of the Atlantic 10 Conference, in April 2005.

== College career ==
At the time when Jackson started his college basketball career at Duquesne, the school's basketball program was in the midst of one of its worst stretches ever, reaching 10 wins just twice in 11 years, in repeating losing seasons. The 2005–06 season wouldn't reverse the trend, on the contrary as the 3–24 season was the worst in the school's 92 year history. Despite this, Jackson started 21 of 27 games, and had comparatively good stats for a freshman (second on the team in assists and steals, and third in assist-to-turnover ratio in the conference).

The team's head coach, Danny Nee, was fired and replaced by Ron Everhart, and he would make sweeping changes to the roster, bringing in 10 new players, whilst only keeping two from the previous team, including Jackson, after a face to face meeting between the two.

In a team shook by a campus shooting (see Duquesne shooting), Jackson was a leader for the team as a sophomore. Playing in all games – starting most – he was in the conference top-10 in assists (3.8 per game) and steals (1.4 per game), whilst adding 11 points and 5 rebounds on average, as part of a team with an improved collective 10–19 record.

Jackson's junior season followed that trend, though he earned less minutes of playing time, as per Everhart's rotation policy. He led his team in minutes and assists, while also scoring in double figures and, posting 5+ rebounds 13 games during the season. With averages of 9 points per game and 4 rebounds per game, for the season. The Dukes had their first winning season since 1994.

Fittingly, he reached the pinnacle of his collegiate career in his last college season. Being the only senior in a team with seven freshmen, he started in every single game, as he led the team in scoring and assists (with a school record of 194), and was second on the team in rebounding and steals. His stats also ranked in the top 5 for the whole conference, in seven different statistical categories (of which included scoring, assists, steals, and minutes), which led to him being selected to the All-A 10 first team, and the NABC All-District 4 first team, also being awarded A-10 Most Improved Player.

On a team level, it was also successful season, as the Dukes had a 21–13 record in the regular season, their best since 1971, which allowed them to enter the NIT tournament. Jackson played in his last Dukes game in the first round of the NIT, against Virginia Tech, which was a befitting farewell, as he scored 46 points in the game (tied for the fourth highest single-game point total for the school), in a double overtime loss. At the end of his Duquesne college career, Jackson's name was inscribed into the university's record books, as his 194 assists in 2009, broke Norm Nixon's previous school record. Besides that, he was also tied for 1st place in games played (having played in all of his team's games, in every season), was in 3rd place in career assists (with 505), was in 6th place in steals (169), and in 7th place in field goal percentage.

== Professional career ==
With his collegiate career over, Jackson turned his sights to the professional game and the 2009 NBA draft, first by playing in the Portsmouth Invitational Tournament then by attending workouts with a half-dozen NBA teams, despite this he was not predicted to be drafted though he did attract attention from the Indiana Pacers. He would go undrafted in the end but did rejoin the Pacers for the NBA Summer League where, in a de facto competition with A. J. Price for the third point guard spot on the roster, Price was signed over him. Not financially interested in D-League contract offers, Jackson planned a move abroad.

=== Antalya Büyükşehir Belediyesi (2009–2010) ===
Jackson moved to Antalya Büyükşehir Belediyesi of the Turkish Basketball Super League in July 2009, penning his first professional contract. For his first experience abroad he suffered from culture shock but developed his game in what he described as a physical league with hard fought games and had a good season statistically with 15,2 points, 4,9 rebounds and 4 assists per game.

=== Virtus Pallacanestro Bologna (2010) ===
Antalya finished in mid-table, missing the playoffs, but Jackson's season wasn't over as he then signed for Italian LBA side Virtus Bologna in April 2010 as a replacement for the injured Petteri Koponen to play in the playoffs. He was an instant fit for the team, starting in all games of their first round playoff run, his good performances and statistics prompting the team to offer him an extension.

=== Bilbao Basket (2010–2012) ===
It was to be in vain for Virtus as Jackson signed a contract with Spanish Liga ACB team Bilbao Basket, signing a two-year deal (the second year an option) with an NBA clause in June 2010, after a summer league appearance with the Cleveland Cavaliers yielded no contract he joined the team for good. He was brought in by coach Fotios Katsikaris to replace the club's legend, Javi Salgado, with a more athletic and dynamic play-maker, a decision that earned critics from fans and observers.

A frosty reception awaited Jackson in Spain, having to adapt to the competition level, considered the best national domestic league in Europe, and his dual role as facilitator and crunch time scorer, he had ups and downs before becoming the focal point of his team, leading them to 6th in the league before having a decisive role in their run to the playoff final, beating powerhouse Real Madrid in the process. Though they would lose in the final to Barcelona, Jackson played the most minutes of any player in the playoffs, also breaking the top 10 for scoring, rebounding, assists and steals and the option on his second year was taken by the Basques, with the guard motivated by the prospect of playing in the EuroLeague, the continents' premier competition.

His second season in Spain was as successful, being named the fifth best point guard in the Liga ACB as he led his team to another playoff appearance though this time they lost in the first round, Jackson top scoring for Bilbao in both games. Above all he discovered the EuroLeague, among the European elite he had seesaw performances, none so evident in two back-to-back games against Real Madrid, the first a shocker with only 2 points in 20 minutes in a loss, the second a Top 16 Week 4 MVP performance, scoring 15 points with 10 assists and only 1 turnover in a 93–69 victory that allowed Bilbao to finish above Madrid in their group and reach the Quarterfinals. In the playoffs, he upped his game against future finalist CSKA Moscow, leading Bilbao in points, assists and steals to rank fifth for the playoff phase in Performance Index Rating, despite this Bilbao was overpowered by the Russians and lost the series 3–1.

Jackson was out of contract at the end of the 2011–12 season and turned down a contract extension offer from Bilbao, ending his tenure there following "two marvelous years".

=== CSKA Moscow (2012–2017) ===
On June 19, 2012, Jackson joined former opponents CSKA Moscow, penning a 3-year deal with perennial Russian champions, hours after they announced the return of former coach Ettore Messina who coached Real Madrid in 2010–11. He chose to sign with them instead of having another go at the NBA summer league.

Transforming from a star player to a role player at the European giants, Jackson found it hard to adapt to the perfectionist Messina's coaching style and struggled with form and confidence, more so when the club brought Theo Papaloukas at his position. Little by little he improved, later playing a part in CSKA's championship victories in the Russian League and the more competitive VTB United League, earning his first silverware, though they lost to Olympiacos in the EuroLeague semifinals, as the preceding year in the final.

Despite offers from other EuroLeague teams of a starting place on their roster he stayed put and was also confirmed by CSKA who had an option to terminate his contract. At the beginning of the season Jackson found himself behind Miloš Teodosić and newly arrived Jeremy Pargo in the rotation, playing most of his minutes as a shooting guard, for instance in the October exhibition game against the Minnesota Timberwolves.

When Teodosić got injured in March 2014, Jackson was chosen to replace him, playing nearly 31 minutes per game in the EuroLeague quarter-finals against Panathinaikos, though he finished with only 5.4 in PIR. Teodosić reclaimed his place after healing and Jackson barely featured in the semi-final meltdown loss to Maccabi Tel Aviv, he even picked up a knee injury late in the game, which kept him out of the Red Army club's consolation come from behind title in the VTB United League.

Having again seen the club fail in their EuroLeague title quest, the management decided to change the team roster, replacing Messina with Dimitrios Itoudis and Nando de Colo was signed to be the team's new shooting guard, with Teodosić's contract extended. This left one of Jackson or Pargo as surplus to requirements, amidst interest from Valencia and due to the cost of Pargo's contract, coach Itoudis voted for Jackson and it was Pargo that was released.

Jackson repaid that faith with a strong start to the 2014–15 season, including a stretch in December that saw him nominated for the VTB United League Monthly Award. He also had a decisive contribution in the EuroLeague victory against Anadolu Efes Istanbul in January, scoring 21 points without missing a single shot along with 4 rebounds and 4 assists to finish behind teammate De Colo in the Top 16 Round 3 MVP rankings. In a rotation system with De Colo, Teodosić and Sonny Weems occupying either the point guard, shooting guard or small forward positions, Jackson was often a substitute, however he had important contributions when called upon, for example in another EuroLeague semi-final loss to Olympiacos, where his 7 steals broke the Final Four single game record, with 9 points, 3 assists for 1 turnover and 4 fouls drawn he was the third best rated player in that game.

Jackson was credited as "one of CSKA's best players down the stretch" in the VTB United League playoffs, posting 8.7 points, 6.1 assists and 1.8 steals per game whilst playing more minutes (24.5) and being seen as more effective than fellow guards De Colo and Teodosić. The Moscow club finished unbeaten in the playoffs to win the 2014–15 VTB United League as Jackson contributed 12 points and 8 assists in the final series Game 3 against Khimki.

On June 19, 2015, he signed a two-year extension with CSKA Moscow.

=== Beijing Ducks (2017–2018) ===
On July 6, 2017, Jackson signed a two-year contract with the Beijing Ducks of the Chinese Basketball Association.

=== Houston Rockets (2018) ===
Near the end of the 2017–18 NBA season, Jackson would sign a contract with the Houston Rockets, replacing the position previously held by Tim Quarterman. Jackson would make his NBA debut on April 11, 2018, scoring eight points with three rebounds and an assist in an 83–96 loss to the Sacramento Kings. However, in this debut game, his last name was missing on his team jersey. Later Jackson had his debut in NBA playoffs on April 18, 2018, in a 102–82 win over the Minnesota Timberwolves. On July 5, 2018, he was waived by the Rockets.

=== Beijing Ducks (2018–2019) ===
Immediately after his departure from the Houston Rockets on July 5, 2018, Jackson returned to the Beijing Ducks. On November 2, 2018, Jackson recorded a triple-double after racking up 32 points, 10 rebounds and 10 assists in a 113–118 loss to the Shanghai Sharks. On December 16 Jackson terminated his contract with Beijing.

=== Maccabi Tel Aviv (2019–2020) ===
On December 16, 2019, Jackson signed with Maccabi Tel Aviv of the Israeli Premier League for the rest of the season, joining as an injury cover for John DiBartolomeo and Nate Wolters. He averaged 4.3 points and 1.7 assists per game. On June 14, 2020, Jackson parted ways with the team.

== Career statistics ==
Legend
GP	Games played	GS	Games started	MPG	Minutes per game
FG%	Field-goal percentage	3P%	3-point field-goal percentage	FT%	Free-throw percentage
RPG	Rebounds per game	APG	Assists per game	SPG	Steals per game
BPG	Blocks per game	PPG	Points per game	PIR	Performance index rating
**Bold**	Career high

=== NBA ===
==== Regular season ====
Year	Team	GP	GS	MPG	FG%	3P%	FT%	RPG	APG	SPG	BPG	PPG
2017–18	Houston	1	0	35.0	.333	.250	.500	3.0	1.0	.0	.0	8.0
Career		1	0	35.0	.333	.250	.500	3.0	1.0	.0	.0	8.0

==== Playoffs ====
Year	Team	GP	GS	MPG	FG%	3P%	FT%	RPG	APG	SPG	BPG	PPG
2018	Houston	7	0	2.4	.500	.000	.500	.6	.3	.0	.0	.7
Career		7	0	2.4	.500	.000	.500	.6	.3	.0	.0	.7

=== EuroLeague ===
†	Denotes seasons in which Jackson won the EuroLeague

Year	Team	GP	GS	MPG	FG%	3P%	FT%	RPG	APG	SPG	BPG	PPG	PIR
2011–12	Bilbao	20	**20**	**25.3**	.470	.341	.800	**2.8**	**3.9**	**1.0**	—	**9.1**	**10.3**
2012–13	CSKA Moscow	**30**	6	18.4	.468	.302	.773	1.9	1.3	.5	—	5.0	5.1
2013–14	CSKA Moscow	**30**	7	17.3	.486	.302	**.824**	1.6	2.0	.7	.0	4.8	6.4
2014–15	CSKA Moscow	28	19	21.7	**.542**	.408	.771	2.4	3.1	.9	.0	7.2	10.0
2015–16†	CSKA Moscow	24	18	15.4	.456	.289	.667	1.3	2.3	.4	.0	4.5	4.6
2016–17	CSKA Moscow	**34**	**29**	21.4	**.542**	**.477**	.735	1.4	3.6	.7	.1	7.6	8.8
2019–20	Maccabi	12	2	17.5	.439	.389	.727	1.6	1.7	.3	—	4.3	3.2
Career		178	101	19.7	.492	.367	.762	1.8	2.6	.7	.0	6.2	7.2

=== Domestic league ===
Source: LBA, Liga ACB, VTB United League

Legend
GP	Games played	GS	Games started	MPG	Minutes per game	PPG	Points per game
2P%	Two-point field goal percentage	3P%	3-point field goal percentage	FT%	Free throw percentage
RPG	Rebounds per game	APG	Assists per game	BPG	Blocks per game
SPG	Steals per game	TOPG	Turnovers per game	**Bold**	Career high

Regular season
Year	Team	GP	GS	MPG	PPG	2P%	3P%	FT%	RPG	APG	BPG	SPG	TOPG
2009–10	Canadian Solar BO	2	1	**28.5**	**13.0**	**87.5**	40.0	66.7	**5.0**	**6.5**	0.0	**2.0**	**2,5**
2010–11	Bizkaia Bilbao Basket	**34**	25	26.6	11.5	48.0	43.0	85.0	3.3	2.7	0.0	1.3	1.6
2011–12	Gescrap Bizkaia	**34**	**33**	25.7	10.4	53.0	35.0	74.0	3.3	2.8	0.0	0.9	1.7
2012–13	CSKA Moscow	16	6	19.0	6.4	62.8	31.3	85.7	2.3	1.4	0.0	1.0	1.1
2013–14	CSKA Moscow	16	6	22.9	7.5	72.7	42.9	87.0	4.6	2.9	**0.1**	0,8	1.1
2014–15	CSKA Moscow	28	25	21.8	7.1	64.2	**46.8**	**88.2**	2.9	3.5	0.0	0,8	1.1
Career		130	72	23.9	9.1	55.4	40.2	81.0	3.1	2.8	0.0	1.0	1.3

Playoffs
Year	Team	GP	GS	MPG	PPG	2P%	3P%	FT%	RPG	APG	BPG	SPG	TOPG
2009–10	Canadian Solar BO	5	5	**33.6**	15.0	42.9	66.7	75.0	**4.6**	4.2	0,0	**1.8**	2.8
2010–11	Bizkaia Bilbao Basket	9	**9**	27.4	8.8	44.0	27.0	87.0	3.5	3.2	0.0	1.1	1.3
2011–12	Gescrap Bizkaia	2	2	32.0	**19.0**	44.0	**71.0**	**90.0**	4.0	3.5	0.0	1.0	**3.0**
2012–13	CSKA Moscow	**13**	8	26.1	8.7	54.8	42.9	81.6	3.4	2.5	0.0	0.7	0.8
2014–15	CSKA Moscow	9	8	24.5	8.7	**56.4**	33.3	81.5	3.1	**6.1**	0.0	**1.8**	1.3
Career		38	32	27.3	10.1	46.4	33.68	81.9	3.5	3.8	0.0	1.2	1.4

== Personal life ==
He is nicknamed Ajax, and has sometimes been designated as such by fans and media. It is derived from the similarly named Greek hero that inspired Jackson in a history class. One of his tattoos, on his arm, depicts the warrior.

=== Duquesne shooting ===
On September 17, 2006, Jackson and four other Duquesne teammates Sam Ashaolu, Stuart Baldonado, Shawn James and Kojo Mensah were the victims of an unprovoked shooting on the university's Pittsburgh campus. Ashaolu was shot in the head and neck, Mensah in the shoulder and arm, Baldonado through his back into his elbow, James in his left foot whilst Jackson was only grazed on the wrist by a bullet. He later carried the injured Baldonado to his car and drove him to hospital.

The two shooters, William B. Holmes II and Derek Lee pleaded guilty and were sentenced to respectively up to 40 years and up to 14 years in prison, for having helped them enter a student dance whilst armed, former university student Brittany Jones was sentenced to two years of probation. An altercation started during the dance after a female acquaintance of the shooters flirted with one of the Duquesne players, the players walked away but later re-encountered the two men, who started shooting at them.

Jackson was able to play the next season, the only one of the four to do so, he was a roommate and friend of Ashaolu and helped him through his rehabilitation, even having to carry him to his car and drive him to hospital after a seizure. Though Ashaolu was never able to play basketball again, he graduated in 2009 along with Jackson who earned a psychology degree.
