= Mitzie Jessop Taase =

American Samoan attorney

Acting Attorney General of American Samoa
- In office February 19, 2020 – January 21, 2021
- Governor: Lolo Matalasi Moliga
- Preceded by: Talauega Eleasalo Ale
- Succeeded by: Fainu'ulelei Alailima-Utu

Personal details
- Born: Mitzie Jessop; American Samoa
- Education: University of Utah (BA); Brigham Young University (JD)

Mitzie Jessop Taase is an American Samoan attorney who served as acting Attorney General of American Samoa. Taase was appointed to the role to succeed Talauega Eleasalo Ale, who resigned to run for Lieutenant Governor of American Samoa in the 2020 American Samoa gubernatorial election.

== Early life and education ==
Jessop-Ta'ase was born and raised in American Samoa. She earned a Bachelor of Arts in English literature from the University of Utah and Juris Doctor from the J. Reuben Clark Law School at Brigham Young University.

== Career ==
After graduating from law school, Jessop-Ta'ase returned to American Samoa. For several years, Taase worked in the office of the Attorney General of American Samoa, including as deputy attorney general and director of the Department of Legal Affairs. In 2017, Jessop-Ta'ase left the attorney general's office to serve as Senate Counsel of the American Samoa Fono. She was named Acting Attorney General by Talauega Eleasalo Ale in February 2020, shortly before Ale's resignation. She was later confirmed as the first female attorney general for American Samoa.

== Personal life ==
Jessop-Ta'ase's husband, Bone Ta'ase, is a football coach at Faga'itua High School.
