= Mauga Palepoi =

American Samoan chief and politician (died 1963)

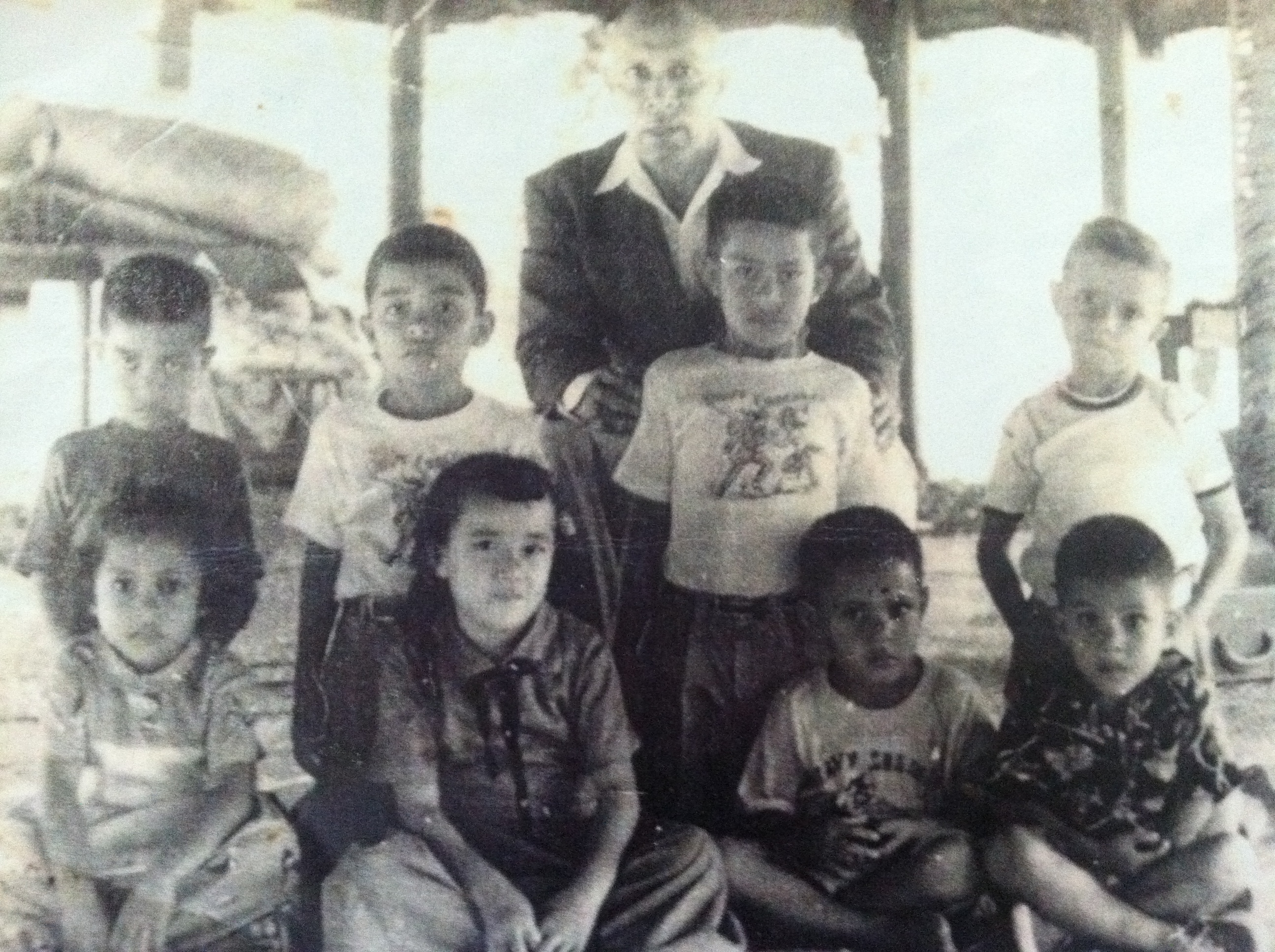
- Palepoi with his grandchildren in 1954

Member of the Senate
- In office –1963
- Constituency: Maoputasi County

Personal details
- Died: 7 February 1963 Pago Pago, American Samoa

Mauga Palepoi (died 7 February 1963) was an American Samoan chief and politician. He served as a member of the Senate

== Biography ==
Palepoi succeeded Mauga Moimoi (a signatory of the Treaty of Cession of Tutuila) as a high chief, and served as a District Governor.

In 1924 he was convicted of assault and battery. This was followed by a conviction for illegal possession of alcohol in 1946, and a conviction for smuggling alcohol in 1952. Following his third conviction, a petition was presented to the High Court requesting that his chiefly title be revoked. However, the petition was rejected as fewer than 75% of adult family members had signed it. A previous petition had been rejected in 1945 due to a lack of evidence of misconduct. He was pardoned for his smuggling conviction by the Governor in 1954, allowing him to be reinstated as a chief of Maoputasi.

Palepoi became a Senator for Maoputasi County, serving until his death in Pago Pago on 7 February 1963.

His grandson Malaetasi Togafau later served as Attorney General of American Samoa.
