= Roy W. Simonson =

American soil scientist

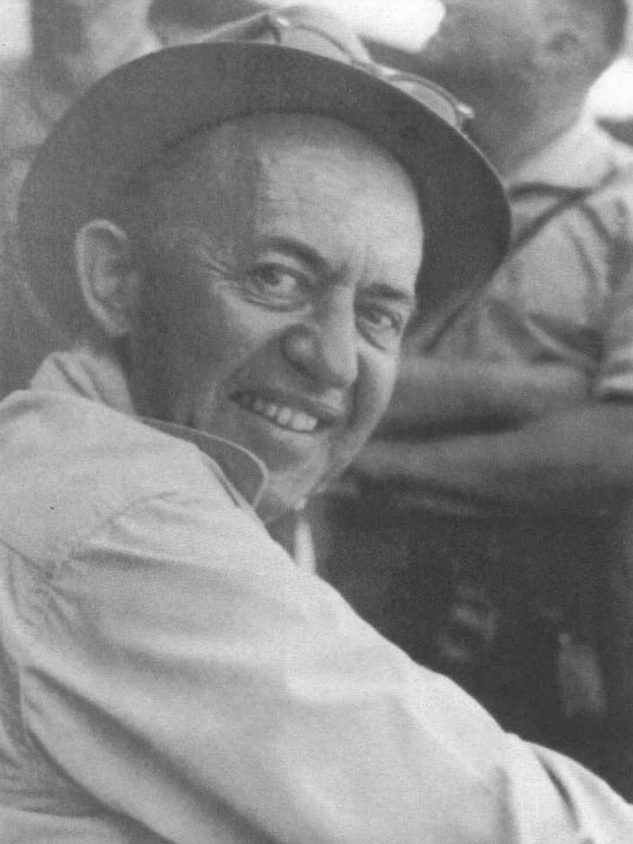
- in 1964
- Born: September 7, 1908; Agate, North Dakota
- Died: November 2, 2008 (aged 100)
- Education: North Dakota Agricultural College (B.S., 1934); University of Wisconsin–Madison College of Agricultural and Life Sciences (Ph.D., 1938)
- Scientific career
- Workplaces: Iowa State College; Military Geology Unit; United States Department of Agriculture - Soil survey University of Maryland, College Park
- Doctoral advisor: Emil Truog
- Other academic advisors: Charles E. Kellogg

Roy W. Simonson (September 7, 1908 – November 2, 2008) was an American scientist, professor, and writer who studied soil across the United States and on islands in the Western Pacific.

He taught at Iowa State College from 1938 to 1943 and then became a Soil Correlator for the Division of Soil Survey at the United States Department of Agriculture. During World War II, Simonson worked for the Military Geology Unit to map soils on islands in the Western Pacific. Simonson spent the rest of his career at the Soil Survey until his retirement in 1973. In his retirement, he occasionally taught courses on soil genesis as a visiting professor at the University of Maryland until relocating to Oberlin, Ohio, in 1993.

Roy Simonson was born to Norwegian immigrants (Otto & Johanna Simonson) on September 7, 1908, on a farm in Agate, North Dakota 16 miles from the Canadian border. He was the second of eight children. He attended high school in Bisbee at age 11. In 1926, Simonson attended North Dakota Agricultural College in Fargo to study engineering, later switching to agriculture in 1929. He studied soils under Charles E. Kellogg and helped map the soils of McKenzie County in the summer of 1932. He earned his Bachelor of Science in Soils and Chemistry in 1934. He earned his doctorate in Soil Science from the University of Wisconsin-Madison in 1938, where his advisor was Emil Truog.

After serving as an assistant professor of Soils at Iowa State College from 1938 to 1942, he worked in the USDA federal soil survey programs, first with the Bureau of Chemistry and Soils and then with the Soil Conservation Service. He served as Principal Soil Correlator for the Southern United States, Chief Soil Scientist for Pacific Surveys, 1947–48; Assistant Chief of Soil Surveys, 1949–52; and Director for Soil Classification and Correlation, 1953–1971.

Simonson resided in Hyattsville, Maryland for much of his career, where he was recruited by soil professors at the University of Maryland to volunteer with teaching and research programs. Simonson gave numerous lectures and seminars on soil science at the university. He would present an annual two hour “soils of the world” lecture, on soils of the (then) 10 orders of Soil Taxonomy, to the annually taught soil morphology, genesis and classification class (AGRO 414, now NRSC 414). For these lectures, he utilized his vast collection of 35mm slides of soil profiles and landscapes – taken during his professional travels around the world.

In 1967 Simonson became the editor-in-chief of soil science journal Geoderma where he published numerous articles.

He was inducted into the Mid-Atlantic Association of Professional Soil Scientists (MAPSS) in 1989 as its first honorary member.

== Published works ==
- Six Months Along the Missouri (2004)
- Letters, Letter Segments, and Memoirs from a Farm (2005)
- Concept of Soil
- Historical Highlights of Soil Survey and Soil Classification with Emphasis on the United States, 1899–1970 (1989)
