= Sam Ashaolu =

American basketball player

Personal information
- Born: December 25, 1982 (age 43)
- Listed height: 6 ft 7 in (2.01 m)
- Listed weight: 225 lb (102 kg)

Career information
- High school: Coastal Christian School (Virginia Beach, Virginia)
- College: TVCC (2004–2005); Lake Region State (2005–2006); Duquesne (2006–2007)
- Position: Forward

Sam Ashaolu (born December 25, 1982) is a Canadian former basketball player. He was a member of the basketball teams of Trinity Valley Community College, Lake Region State College and Duquesne University before injuries sustained in a campus shooting in 2006 cut his career short.

== Biography ==
Ashaolu played for Trinity Valley Community College during the 2004–2005 season where he averaged 6.9 points and 3.7 rebounds as a freshman. The following season he transferred to Lake Region State College where he started 23 of 27 games, averaging 15.3 points and 6.3 rebounds per game, and helping the Royals to a 21–9 record.

In 2006 he transferred to Duquesne University in the NCAA Division I and was expected to have an immediate impact for Ron Everhart's team. On September 17, 2006, Ashaolu along with his Duquesne teammates Aaron Jackson, Stuart Baldonado, Shawn James and Kojo Mensah were shot when they were returning from a party on the college campus, with Ashaolu being shot twice in the head. While initially planning on returning to the court, due to the severity of the injuries he sustained in the shooting, Ashaolu never played again. In 2009, he earned his college diploma from Duquesne.

== Personal life ==
Ashaolu is the brother of basketball player Olu Ashaolu, former University of Oregon University and Louisiana Tech Men’s Basketball player and overseas professional basketball player.
