= Anastassiya Andrianova =

Ukrainian-born American academic and politician

Member-elect of the North Dakota House of Representatives from the 11th district
- Assuming office December 2026
- Succeeding: Adam Goldwyn

Personal details
- Born: Kyiv, Ukraine
- Party: Democratic
- Spouse: Adam Goldwyn
- Occupation: Academic

Anastassiya Andrianova is a Ukrainian-born American academic and politician. A member of the Democratic Party, she is the member-elect for the 11th district of the North Dakota House of Representatives.

Andrianova was born in Kyiv. She emigrated to the United States, and attended the City University of New York, earning her PhD degree in comparative literature. After earning her degree, she served as a professor in the department of English at North Dakota State University.
