= Richard J. Sauer =

American academic administrator

Richard J. Sauer (born on November 15, 1939) is an American academic and academic administrator. Sauer was interim president of the University of Minnesota in 1988.

Richard Sauer grew up in Walker, Minnesota, and graduated from high school in 1957. He attended St. John's University in Collegeville, Minnesota, with a major in biology and a minor in chemistry. Sauer went to the University of Michigan for a master's of science in zoology and high school teaching qualification. Instead of teaching, Sauer chose a National Defense Education Act fellowship to attend North Dakota State University for a Ph.D. in entomology with a thesis on the crab spiders of North Dakota. He earned his doctorate at age 27.

Sauer began teaching biology at St. Cloud State College in the mid-1960s and then teaching biology to teachers, teaching entomology through the university extension program, and then working in the mid-1970s with the federal Department of Agriculture. He became acting associate director of the Experiment Station at Michigan State University, then head of the entomology department at Kansas State University. Sauer was hired as head of the Agriculture Experiment Station at the University of Minnesota.

Sauer was deputy vice-president of the University of Minnesota, vice president of agriculture, forestry, and home economics, and then interim president. He succeeded Kenneth Keller and was succeeded by Nils Hasselmo.
