= Malaetasi Togafau =

American Samoan politician and judge

Sialega Malaetasi Mauga Togafau

Attorney General of American Samoa
- In office January 2005 – 9 March 2007
- Governor: Togiola Tulafono
- Preceded by: Fiti Sunia
- Succeeded by: Afa Ripley Jr.
- In office 1993–1997
- Governor: A. P. Lutali
- Preceded by: Tautai Aviata Fa'alevao
- Succeeded by: Toetagata Albert Mailo

Member of the American Samoa House of Representatives from the Itūʻau County district
- In office 1997–2007
- In office 1983–1986

Personal details
- Born: 4 June 1946 Nuʻuuli, American Samoa
- Died: 9 March 2007 (aged 60)

Sialega Malaetasi Mauga Togafau (June 4, 1946 – March 9, 2007) was an American Samoan politician, judge, and lawyer. He was a member of the American Samoa House of Representatives, American Samoa's first Administrative Law Judge, and ultimately Attorney General.

== Biography ==
Togafau was born on June 4, 1946, to Femalua'i Palepoi Mauga Sialo'i. His grandparents Posiulai Mamea of the Maluia family in Nuuuli and Togafau Sefulu Aumoeualogo of Amouli raised him in Nuʻuuli, American Samoa.

Given the name Steve Mauga at birth, Malaetasi was the third of 11 children born to Femalua'i. Malaetasi was baptized by his grandparents Posiulai and Togafau at the Nuuuli Congregational Christian Church, officiated by the Reverend Elder Tanielu Aasa's tenure as pastor of Nuuuli EFKS. His mother's father, Paramount Chief Mauga Palepoi anointed him as *Malaetasi."

Togafau was an ordained Deacon of the Congregational Christian Church of American Samoa and held this sacred role until his death in 2007. He was an active member of the Nuuuli Congregational Christian Church.

Togafau served as a member of the American Samoa House of Representatives from 1983 to 1986. He resigned in 1986 to take up an appointment as a Judge of the District Court of American Samoa, and served in that role until he was appointed as Attorney-General in the administration of Governor A. P. Lutali in 1993. He was elected to the House of Representatives again in the Ituau District in 1996. In March 2000 he was appointed as American Samoa's first Administrative Law Judge, subsequently surrendering his seat in the House to take up the role. In January 2005 he was again appointed Attorney-General by Governor Togiola Tulafono. In 2006 he was diagnosed with colon cancer and subsequently travelled to Honolulu for medical treatment. He died of complications in March 2007.

Prior to returning to American Samoa, Togafau was associated with the Church of Jesus Christ of Latter-day Saints, and married Oreta Mapu in the LDS Temple in Laie in 1977. A memorial service was held in the Kalihi, Hawaii chapel of the LDS Church, West Honolulu Stake. [Obituary, Honolulu Advertiser]. His final services were held at the Nuuuli Congregational Christian Church conducted by Rev. Dr. Elia Titimaea Taase.

== Marriage ==
Togafau married Dr. Oreta S. Mapu, from the villages of Aua and Aoa, on December 10, 1977, in Laie, Hawaii.

== Public service ==
Togafau held the chiefly title of Afioga ile Taumafaalofi (SIALEGA title bestowed on November 27, 2003). He was bestowed this ancient title of Nuuuli, that was held by his maternal uncle, Palepoi Mauga Jr.

- Atilavea --- a minor chiefly title of Atilave'a was conferred in 1993 from his grandmother Posiulai's Maluia Family. As Atilavea, Togafau was responsible for organizing and supporting activities for the young men of the Maluia clan as well as the village in general. Togafau actively participated in the Nuuuli Aumaga, young untitled men of Nuuuli, with the coordinating of training for the yearly long boat regatta, or tuuga Fautasi.

== Professional career ==
- Assistant Public Defender - American Samoa High High Court September - December, 1974
- Legal Cousel - American Samoa Delegates-at-Large Office, Washington DC (1975–1978)
- Legislative Cousel - American Samoa Representative Office, U.S Congress(1979–1982)

== Education ==
- Peru State University; Graduate of 1971; Awarded Bachelor Science in Geography With Honors
- California Western University; Graduate of 1974; Awarded Juris Doctor
- Leone High School; Graduate of 1966; First School Valedictorian.
