= Agate, North Dakota =

Unincorporated community in North Dakota, United States

- Unincorporated community
- Location within the state of North Dakota Agate (the United States)
- Coordinates: 48°37′22″N 99°29′36″W
- Country: United States
- State: North Dakota
- County: Rolette, Towner
- Elevation: 1,657 ft (505 m)
- Time zone: UTC-6 (Eastern (CST))
  - Summer (DST): UTC-5 (EDT)
- ZIP codes: 58310
- Area code: 701
- GNIS feature ID: 1033828

Agate is an unincorporated community in southeastern Rolette and western Towner counties in the U.S. state of North Dakota. It lies along North Dakota Highway 66, south of Rolla and northwest of Cando, the respective seats of Rolette and Towner Counties. Its elevation is 1,657 feet (505 m). Agate has the ZIP code 58310.

== History ==
Agate was laid out in 1906. A post office was established at Agate in 1907, and remained in operation until it was discontinued in 1964. The community was named for local deposits of agate.

The population was 15 in 1940.
