= Jaime C. Grunlan =

American material scientist and academic

- Occupations: Material scientist and academic

Academic background
- Education: B.S. in Chemistry; PhD in Materials Science and Engineering
- Alma mater: North Dakota State University; University of Minnesota

Jaime C. Grunlan is a material scientist and academic. He is a professor of mechanical engineering, and Leland T. Jordan ’29 chair professor at Texas A&M University.

Grunlan is most known for his research in the areas of polymer nanocomposites, antiflammable nanocoatings, gas barrier thin films, and thermoelectric materials. His research work has been published in over 200 journal papers. He is the recipient of Carl Dahlquist Award and L.E. Scriven Young Investigator Award. In recent years, his work has involved the development of thin (<1 μm) gas barrier, flame retardant and thermoelectric nanocoatings through layer by layer assembly, as well as the study of thick film nanocomposites (>10 μm) with a particular emphasis on polyelectrolyte complexes and electrically conductive and thermoelectric materials.

Grunlan is a Fellow of International Association of Advanced Materials (IAAM), and American Society of Mechanical Engineers (ASME), and has been elected as a Senior Member of the National Academy of Inventors. He is Editor of Journal of Materials Science, and Associate Editor of Green Materials and npj Materials Degradation. He also serves on the International Advisory Board for Macromolecular Rapid Communications

== Education ==
Grunlan earned his Bachelor of Science degree in Chemistry with a specialization in Polymers and Coatings from North Dakota State University in Fargo, North Dakota, in May 1997. He went on to receive his PhD in Materials Science and Engineering with a minor in Chemistry from the University of Minnesota in Minneapolis, Minnesota in June 2001.

== Career ==
Grunlan began his career in June 2001 as a Senior Research Engineer at the Avery Research Center in Pasadena, CA, where he focused on the research and development of polymer-based electronic and biological materials for new business development. He served as an adjunct professor at Azusa Pacific University from August 2002 to December 2003 and at Biola University from January 2002 to May 2002. In July 2004, he joined Texas A&M University in College Station, Texas, as an assistant professor, where he won an NSF Career award. He then held an appointment as an Associate Professor and Gulf Oil/Thomas Dietz Development Professor I from September 2010 to August 2014. He also served as the Linda and Ralph Schmidt '68 Professor, with a joint appointment in Chemistry and Materials Science and Engineering, from July 2015 to August 2020. Since September 2020, he has held the Leland T. Jordan '29 Chair Professorship at Texas A&M University, with a joint appointment in Chemistry and Materials Science and Engineering.

== Research ==
Grunlan has focused his research on protective polymer and nanocomposite systems. One of his focus areas has been oxygen barrier films for food, pharmaceutical, and electronics packaging. He has also conducted research on environmentally benign flame retardant and thermal shielding treatments, as well as high dielectric breakdown strength materials.

=== Flame retardant polymeric materials ===
Grunlan's research has resulted in highly effective flame-retardant surface treatments for flammable polymeric materials, addressing the issue of toxic fire protection. The flame retardant coating research has been recognized in publications, including Nature, Smithsonian Magazine, Chemical & Engineering News, New York Times and Science Daily. His research group has developed two waterbased green coating technologies that protect fabric used in clothing, and foam used in upholstered furniture, without using toxic molecules. His treatments have a combination of efficacy and safety, based upon phosphate and nitrogen-rich polyelectrolytes and clay nanoplatelets. More recently in 2020, his invited review entitled "Flame retardant surface treatments" was the cover article for the April 2020 issue of Nature Reviews Materials.

=== High power factor polymer nanocomposites ===
Grunlan has developed organic thermoelectric coatings for fabric that can harness a person's body heat to generate power. He created a paintable/printable material made of organic components and used polyaniline, graphene, and double-walled nanotubes deposited through layer-by-layer assembly technique. The resulting one-micron thick coating exhibited exceptional electrical conductivity (σ ~ 1.9 × 10^{5} S·^{m-1}) and Seebeck coefficient (S ~ 120 μV·K^{−1}) for a completely organic material. The thermoelectric power factor (PF = S^{2}·σ^{−1}) is among the highest values ever reported for a completely organic material and among the highest for any material measured at room temperature. In addition, he has authored a review paper which was featured on the front cover of Advanced Materials and his research in this area has also resulted in the issuance of a US patent.

Grunlan's research in the field of thermoelectric properties of carbon nanotube (CNT)-filled polymer composites includes enhancing conductivity in affordable single-walled carbon nanotube (SWNT)-filled composites through the use of emulsion polymer, enhancing electrical and mechanical behavior with clay in SWNT/epoxy composites, and demonstrating the potential of polymer nanocomposites as lightweight thermoelectric materials. In 2010, he improved thermoelectric properties of (CNT)-filled composites through junction modification. Apart from this, having concentrated his research on liquid exfoliation of layered materials in a collaborative study, he highlighted WS_{2} and MoS_{2} as effective polymer reinforcements, whereas WS_{2}/carbon nanotube hybrid films showed high conductivity, promising thermoelectric properties. Furthermore, he participated in a significant study of nanoplatelet exfoliation in surfactant-water solution.

=== High gas barrier polymer and nanocomposite thin films ===
Through the use of polymer and nanocomposite systems that can match the barrier of metal, Grunlan's research on polymer-based gas barrier thin films has concentrated on developing environmentally sustainable packaging for food, medicine, and electronics. In this area, his research group created thin, water-based coatings that can make commodity plastic packaging almost oxygen-impermeable, enhancing food safety. Their all-polymer thin film has an undetectable oxygen transmission rate at high humidity (OTR < 0.005 cm^{3}·m^{−1}·day^{−1}) and has the potential to compete with aluminized and SiOx-coated films while being more eco-friendly and simpler to recycle. He has also developed sub-micron, nanobrick wall coatings made up of polyelectrolytes and clay that exhibit unique barrier behavior and his research group has studied the mechanisms behind this behavior as well as published several studies on the topic.

=== Nanoparticle dispersion and microstructure in solutions and solid polymer nanocomposites ===
Grunlan's research group was among the first to use stimuli-responsive polymers as dispersing agents to tailor nanoparticle dispersion in solution and nanostructure in solidified polymer nanocomposites. He was awarded an NSF Career Award for his work on stimuli-responsive dispersion of carbon nanotubes, which was based on his previous publication demonstrating weak polyelectrolyte control of carbon nanotube dispersion in water through changes in pH. The study showed that Poly(acrylic acid) [PAA] can control the level of SWNT dispersion in aqueous mixtures and the state of dispersion in a solid composite by changing pH, varying SWNT microstructure between aggregated and well-exfoliated states, as observed through electron microscopy and electrical conductivity measurements. Later, his group showed that carbon nanotube dispersion in water could also be tailored by employing a thermo-responsive, pyrene-modified poly(N-cyclopropylacrylamide).

=== Chromate conversion coating replacement using polymer nanocomposite thin films ===
Grunlan's research has also focused on developing water-based, environmentally benign nanobrick wall thin films that protect metal surfaces such as steel, aluminum from corrosion without toxic chemistries. His initial studies showed that these nanocomposite coatings can provide corrosion protection for several days, even when only a few hundred nanometers thick. His work indicated that applying a 300 nm thick coating to aluminum can enhance impedance by two orders of magnitude and protect it from corrosion for five days. Additionally, his research established that nanocoatings are a more effective and eco-friendlier substitute for chromate conversion coatings, as they need less metal pretreatment and are non-toxic. It was demonstrated that a coating as thin as 90 nm can decrease copper's corrosion rate by three orders of magnitude in a harsh sour-acid environment.

== Awards and honors ==
- 2007-2012 – National Science Foundation (NSF) Career
- 2010 – Carl Dahlquist Award, Pressure Sensitive Tape Council (PSTC)
- 2012 – L.E. Scriven Young Investigator Award, International Society of Coating Science and Technology (ISCST)
- 2018 – Fellow, American Society of Mechanical Engineers (ASME)
- 2018 – Doctor honoris causa, Southern Brittany University, France
- 2019 – Senior Member, National Academy of Inventors
- 2021 – Fellow, International Association of Advanced Materials

== Selected articles ==
- Grunlan, J. C., Mehrabi, A. R., Bannon, M. V., & Bahr, J. L. (2004). Water‐based single‐walled‐nanotube‐filled polymer composite with an exceptionally low percolation threshold. Advanced Materials, 16(2), 150–153.
- Kim, D., Kim, Y., Choi, K., Grunlan, J. C., & Yu, C. (2010). Improved thermoelectric behavior of nanotube-filled polymer composites with poly (3, 4-ethylenedioxythiophene) poly (styrenesulfonate). ACS nano, 4(1), 513–523.
- Coleman, J. N., Lotya, M., O’Neill, A., Bergin, S. D., King, P. J., Khan, U., ... & Nicolosi, V. (2011). Two-dimensional nanosheets produced by liquid exfoliation of layered materials. Science, 331(6017), 568–571.
- Smith, R. J., King, P. J., Lotya, M., Wirtz, C., Khan, U., De, S., ... & Coleman, J. N. (2011). Large‐scale exfoliation of inorganic layered compounds in aqueous surfactant solutions. Advanced materials, 23(34), 3944–3948.
- Blackburn, J. L., Ferguson, A. J., Cho, C., & Grunlan, J. C. (2018). Carbon‐nanotube‐based thermoelectric materials and devices. Advanced Materials, 30(11), 1704386.
- Lazar, S. T., Kolibaba, T. J., & Grunlan, J. C. (2020). Flame-retardant surface treatments. Nature Reviews Materials, 5(4), 259–275.
- Chiang, H. C., Iverson, E. T., Schmieg, K., Stevens, D. L., & Grunlan, J. C. (2023). Highly moisture resistant super gas barrier polyelectrolyte complex thin film. Journal of Applied Polymer Science, 140(7), e53473.
