= 1968 American Samoan legislative election =

- November 1968
- All 20 seats in the House of Representatives; 10 seats needed for a majority

Legislative elections were held in American Samoa in November 1968.

== Campaign ==
The elections were held amidst a major debate over whether inhabitants of the territory should seek American citizenship. Further antagonism was caused by Governor Owen Stuart Aspinall vetoing constitutional amendments that would grant the Legislature authority over job appointments and spending.

In June 1968 the Democratic Party of American Samoa affiliated to the American Democratic Party. Party members were in favour of American citizenship and an elected Governor.

The American Samoa Party was established in August, with the objective of retaining the chieftainship system and communal land ownership.

In September the Republicans were formed and affiliated with the American Republican Party. The party opposed American citizenship, the chieftainship system and educational television.

== Results ==
Only five incumbents in the 20-seat House of Representatives were re-elected. Party affiliation was unclear, with the Democratic Party estimated to have nine members, the Republicans five and the American Samoa Party two; the remaining four members were independents.
