= Earl Bute =

American sports coach, athletics administrator (1899–1988)

Biographical details
- Born: August 29, 1899; Grand Ridge, Illinois, U.S.
- Died: October 14, 1988 (aged 89); Breckenridge, Minnesota, U.S.

Playing career

Football
- 1923: North Dakota Agricultural
- Position: Quarterback

Coaching career (HC unless noted)

Football
- 1924–1965: Wahpeton / Wahpeton Science

Administrative career (AD unless noted)
- 1924–1966: Wahpeton / Wahpeton Science

Head coaching record
- Overall: 141–100–18 (football)

Accomplishments and honors

Championships
- Football; 1 IAC (1925); 7 NDIAC/NDIC (1936–1939, 1942, 1948, 1962)

Earl Walter "Skip" Bute (August 29, 1899 – October 14, 1988) was an American sports coach and athletics administrator. He coached football, basketball, baseball, track and field, tennis, and golf at Wahpeton State Science School—now known as the North Dakota State College of Science (NDSCS). Bute served as the head football coach at NDSCS from 1924 to 1965. He also taught mathematics and was the athletic director at the school. Wahpeton was a junior college during Bute's tenure, but competed in the North Dakota College Athletic Conference (NDCAC) against mostly four-year schools.

Bute was born on August 29, 1899, in Grand Ridge, Illinois. He attended school in Doran, Minnesota, before going to Wahpeton Science and then North Dakota Agricultural College—now known as North Dakota State University. At North Dakota Agricultural he played football as a quarterback in 1923. Bute resigned as athletic director and coach at Wahpeton Science in 1966. His football teams compiled a record of 141–100–18.

Bute died on October 14, 1988, at a nursing home in Breckenridge, Minnesota.

== Head coaching record ==
=== Football ===
Year	Team	Overall	Conference	Standing	Bowl/playoffs
Wahpeton Wildcats (Interstate Athletic Conference) (1924–1931)
1924	Wahpeton				
1925	Wahpeton		T–1st		
1926	Wahpeton				
1927	Wahpeton				
1928	Wahpeton		3–3	4th	
1929	Wahpeton				
1930	Wahpeton		4–2	T–2nd	
1931	Wahpeton				
Wahpeton Wildcats (North Dakota Intercollegiate Athletic Conference / North Dakota Intercollegiate Conference / North Dakota College Athletic Conference) (1932–1965)
1932	Wahpeton	3–1–1	2–1–1	T–3rd	
1933	Wahpeton	3–3–1	2–2–1	T–4th	
1934	Wahpeton	4–3	3–1	2nd	
1935	Wahpeton	1–4–1	1–3–1	6th	
1936	Wahpeton	6–1	6–0	1st	
1937	Wahpeton	6–0–1	4–0–1	1st	
1938	Wahpeton	7–0	5–0	1st	
1939	Wahpeton	6–1	6–0	1st	
1940	Wahpeton	4–3	3–2	4th	
1941	Wahpeton	3–3	2–2	T–4th	
1942	Wahpeton	4–0	4–0	1st	
1943	No team–World War II				
1944	No team–World War II				
1945	Wahpeton Science	2–2			
1946	Wahpeton Science	4–2	3–1	3rd	
1947	Wahpeton Science	3–4	3–2	4th	
1948	Wahpeton Science	5–2	5–0	T–1st	
1949	Wahpeton Science	3–4–1	3–3	6th	
1950	Wahpeton Science	3–4	2–3	5th	
1951	Wahpeton Science	1–3–1	1–2–1	5th	
1952	Wahpeton Science	2–5	1–5	T–7th	
1953	Wahpeton Science	5–2	4–2	T–3rd	
1950	Wahpeton Science	5–2	4–2	4th	
1955	Wahpeton Science	4–2	4–2	T–3rd	
1956	Wahpeton Science	4–2–1	3–2–1	T–4th	
1957	Wahpeton Science		4–2	4th	
1958	Wahpeton Science	2–5	2–5	6th	
1959	Wahpeton Science		4–2	4th	
1960	Wahpeton Science		0–6	7th	
1961	Wahpeton Science	6–2	4–2	T–2nd	
1962	Wahpeton Science	6–2	5–1	T–1st	
1963	Wahpeton Science	3–5	3–3	5th	
1964	Wahpeton Science		2–4	5th	
1965	Wahpeton Science	2–5–1	0–5–1	T–6th	
Wahpeton / Wahpeton Science:		141–100–18			
Total:		141–100–18			
National championship Conference title Conference division title or championship game berth
