= Donald Hawk Crothers =

American judge and politician

Member of the North Dakota House of Representatives
- In office 1953–1955

Chief Justice of the High Court of American Samoa
- In office 1969–1972

Personal details
- Born: March 4, 1923
- Died: December 16, 2005 (aged 82)
- Party: Republican
- Education: North Dakota Agricultural College; Loyola University Chicago; University of North Dakota

Donald Hawk Crothers (March 4, 1923 – December 16, 2005) was an American judge and politician. He served as a Republican member of the North Dakota House of Representatives.

== Life and career ==
Crothers attended North Dakota Agricultural College, Loyola University Chicago and the University of North Dakota.

Crothers served in the North Dakota House of Representatives from 1953 to 1955.

In 1969, the Nixon administration appointed Crothers to serve as a chief justice of the High Court of American Samoa.

Crothers died on December 16, 2005, at the age of 82.
