= Fainu'ulelei Alailima-Utu =

American Samoan attorney

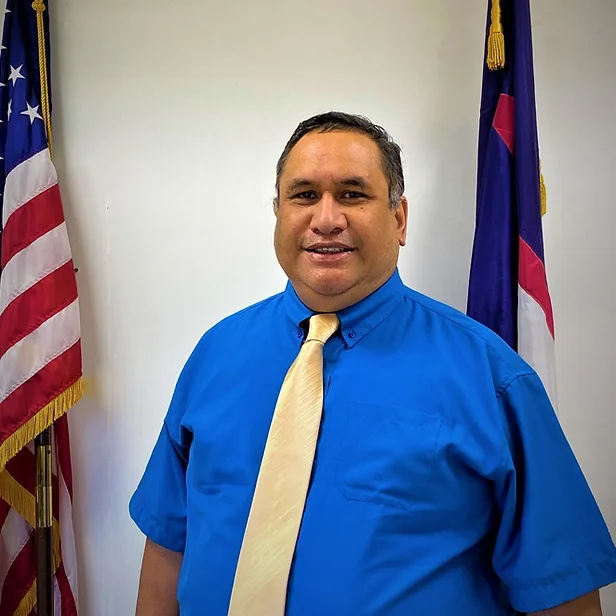

18th Attorney General of American Samoa
- In office January 21, 2021 – February 7, 2025
- Governor: Peleti Mauga; Nikolao Pula
- Preceded by: Mitzie Jessop Taase (acting)
- Succeeded by: Gwen Tauiliili-Langkilde

Personal details
- Born: American Samoa, U.S.
- Relatives: Fainu'ulelei S. Utu (father)
- Education: American Samoa Community College; University of California, Los Angeles (BA, JD)

Fainu'ulelei L. P. Falefatu Alailima-Utu is an American Samoan lawyer who served as the Attorney General of American Samoa from 2021 to 2025.

== Early life and career ==
Alailima-Utu is the son of former American Samoa House Speaker Fainu'ulelei S. Utu. He attended high school in California, moving back to American Samoa to complete an associate's degree at American Samoa Community College. While attending law school at the University of California, Los Angeles, Alailima-Utu participated in protests over a 1989 police brutality incident.

From 1990 to 2003, he worked in the Attorney General's office, as assistant attorney general. He was the legal counsel for the Development Bank of American Samoa from January 2003 to March 2014. After this period, he was the executive director of American Samoa Legal Aid (ASLA). Under his tenure, ASLA assisted victims of Cyclone Gita and received a grant to expand services to the Manuʻa Islands.

== Attorney General ==
Alailima-Utu was nominated as Attorney General of American Samoa in January 2021, and approved by a unanimous vote by both the House of Representatives and Senate.

Legal offices
Preceded by Mitzie Jessop Taase; Acting	Attorney General of American Samoa; 2021–2025	Succeeded by Gwen Tauiliili-Langkilde
