= Lake Region State College =

Junior college in Devils Lake, North Dakota, U.S.

- Motto: We. Change. Lives.
- Type: Public junior college
- Established: 1941; 85 years ago
- Parent institution: North Dakota University System
- Academic affiliations: Space-grant
- President: Dr. Carmen Simone
- Students: 1,916 (2025)
- Location: Devils Lake, North Dakota, United States of America; 48.115°N 98.911°W
- Campus: Rural
- Colors: Blue and White
- Sporting affiliations: Mon-Dak Conference, NJCAA, ACHA
- Mascot: Royals
- Website: www.lrsc.edu

Lake Region State College (LRSC) is a public junior college in Devils Lake, North Dakota. It was founded in 1941 as an extension of the public school system and first known as Devils Lake Junior College and Business School. Several name changes have occurred over the years ranging from Lake Region Junior College to Community College. The current name of Lake Region State College was adopted in 1999. From 1987 until 1999, the college was a branch campus of the University of North Dakota in Grand Forks, known as UND-Lake Region. In 1984, the college became a part of the North Dakota University System.

== Athletics ==
Lake Region State's athletic teams are called the Royals. The college is a member of the National Junior College Athletic Association (NJCAA), primarily competing in the Mon-Dak Conference (MDC) for most of its sports since 1963. They are also members of the American Collegiate Hockey Association (ACHA) for men's and women's ice hockey.

Lake Region State competes in 8 intercollegiate varsity sports: Men's sports include baseball, basketball, ice hockey, and clay target shooting league; while women's sports include basketball, ice hockey, softball, and volleyball.
