= Thomas W. Murphy (American Samoa judge) =

American Samoan judge (1935–1992)

Thomas William Murphy (April 11, 1935 – March 13, 1992) was an Associate Chief Justice of the High Court of American Samoa.

He was born in Hutchinson, Kansas and raised Irish Catholic. He attended the University of Arizona College of Law and graduated in 1958.

== Professional career ==
Murphy practiced law as an independent attorney in the Luhrs Tower in Phoenix, Arizona until he was nominated to the High Court of American Samoa under the Carter Administration and confirmed as an Associate Chief Justice in 1980. During his seven-year tenure, Associate Justice Murphy served with both Chief Justice Richard I. Miyamoto and later served with Chief Justice Robert Gardner. In 1986, the High Court of American Samoa was joined by the United States Supreme Court Associate Justice Anthony Kennedy, who presided over and ruled on many cases before the High Court. Justice Murphy left the High Court of American Samoa in 1987 when he moved to Honolulu, Hawaii where he took a position as an Assistant Federal Public Defender and served in that position until his death on March 13, 1992. His opinions as an Associate Justice of the High Court of American Samoa reflected a liberal ideology, consistent with his lifelong association and membership with the Arizona and American Democratic Party.
