= Attorney General of American Samoa =

Chief law officer for American Samoa government

- Territory seal
- Incumbent; Gwen Tauiliili-Langkilde since February 7, 2025
- Type: Attorney General
- Formation: 1955
- First holder: Peter Tali Coleman

The attorney general of American Samoa is the chief law enforcement officer and chief legal advisor to the American Samoa government.

The attorney general of American Samoa aims to serve, protect, and represent the government and the people by enforcing the laws of American Samoa and the United States. The office has the following divisions:

- Administration Division
- Prosecution Division
- Litigation Division
- Solicitors Division
- Consumer Counsel Division
- Juvenile Division
- Child Support Enforcement Division (CSED)

== List of attorneys general (1955–present) ==
- George William Hedman (1953-1955)
- Peter Tali Coleman (1955–1956)
- Owen Aspinall (1961–1962)
- Alfred J. Gergely (1963–1967)
- Charles H. Habernigg (1967–1969)
- Alfred J. Gergely (1971)
- Donald C. Williams (1971–1975)
- Lyle L. Richmond (1975–1978)
- Frederick William Rohlfing (1978) [Acting]
- Tautai Aviata Fa'alevao (1981–1985)
- Afoa Fouvale Lutu (1985–1989)
- Tautai Aviata Fa'alevao (1989–1992)
- Malaetasi Togafau (1993–1997)
- Toetagata Albert Mailo (7 October 1997 – 31 December 2001)
- Fiti A. Sunia (1 January 2002 – 31 December 2004)
- Malaetasi Togafau (1 January 2005 – 2 May 2007)
- Afa Ripley Jr. (2 May 2007 – 17 January 2013)
- Afoa Moega Lutu (17 January 2013 – 31 January 2014)
- Talauega Eleasalo Ale (1 February 2014 – 30 April 2020)
- Mitzie Jessop Taase (1 May 2020 – 26 January 2021) (Acting)
- Fainu'ulelei Alailima-Utu (January 26, 2021 – February 7, 2025)
- Gwen Tauiliili-Langkilde (February 7, 2025 – present)

== See also ==
- Attorney general
- Justice minister
- Politics of American Samoa
- United States Department of Justice
