= Donald P. Hodel =

American bureaucrat, executive, and energy consultant (born 1935)

Donald Hodel
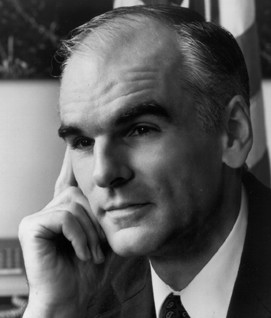

45th United States Secretary of the Interior
- In office February 8, 1985 – January 20, 1989
- President: Ronald Reagan
- Preceded by: William Clark
- Succeeded by: Manuel Lujan Jr.

4th United States Secretary of Energy
- In office November 5, 1982 – February 7, 1985
- President: Ronald Reagan
- Preceded by: James B. Edwards
- Succeeded by: John S. Herrington

Personal details
- Born: Donald Paul Hodel; May 23, 1935 (age 91) Portland, Oregon, U.S.
- Party: Republican
- Spouse: Barbara Stockman (m. 1957–2012)
- Children: 2
- Education: Harvard University (BA); University of Oregon (LLB)

Donald Paul Hodel (born May 23, 1935) is an American former politician who served as the fourth United States secretary of energy from 1982 to 1985 and as the 45th United States secretary of the interior from 1985 to 1989. He was known during his tenure as Secretary of the Interior for his controversial "Hodel Policy," which stated that disused dirt roads and footpaths could be considered right-of-ways under RS 2477.

The Washington Post reported that rather than reduce the production of CFCs to prevent ozone layer destruction, Hodel suggested people should wear hats and use sunscreen. David Prosperi, a spokesman for Hodel, later said that the suggestion was only "one of several options presented to the President".

== Early life and education ==
Hodel was born in Portland, Oregon, the son of Philip E. Hodel and Theresia R. Brodt Hodel. He attended Harvard University. In 1957, he married Barbara Beecher Stockman, who was born in Pittsburgh, Pennsylvania and attended Wellesley College. She married Hodel during her senior year.

They moved to Oregon after graduation and Hodel earned his J.D. at the University of Oregon. While living in Oregon, the Hodels had two sons, and Barbara became a full-time mother.

After their elder son's suicide, the Hodels became evangelical Christians. They became active in church and other Christian ministries and began speaking at evangelical meetings and prayer breakfasts. The Hodels have appeared on The 700 Club with Pat Robertson, The Hour of Power with Robert Schuller, and on Focus on the Family broadcasts with James Dobson, encouraging families that have also lost loved ones to suicide.

== Government career ==
From 1972 to 1977, Hodel was at the Bonneville Power Administration as deputy administrator from 1969 to 1972 and administrator from 1972 to 1977. After leaving it, he said that the Pacific Northwest would eventually need all the power produced by the nuclear power plants proposed by the Washington Public Power Supply System.

Hodel served as United States Secretary of Energy from 1982 to 1985 and Secretary of the Interior from 1985 to 1989 under President Ronald Reagan. He had been Undersecretary of the Interior under James Watt from February 1981 to November 1982.

Critics disrupted his efforts to impose a new management policy on a large amount of federal land and blocked his efforts to create vast new wilderness areas. Despite the criticisms, the Reagan administration added over 2 million acres (8,000 km²) to the national wilderness system. The Hodel policy was continued under Manuel Lujan Jr. in the George H. W. Bush administration. It was rescinded in 1997 by Secretary Bruce Babbitt.

In an article, Hodel wrote, "Throughout President Reagan's eight years, his Secretaries of the Interior pursued these objectives within the framework of his and their conviction that America could have both an improving environment and an adequate energy supply. We did not and do not have to choose between them, as some have contended."

While secretary, Hodel proposed to undertake a study on the removal of the O'Shaughnessy Dam in Yosemite National Park, and the restoration of Hetch Hetchy Valley, a smaller but inundated version of Yosemite Valley. Dianne Feinstein, former mayor of San Francisco, which owns the dam, opposed the study and had it quashed.

In March 1984, the Navajo Nation requested that Secretary of the Interior William Clark make a reasonable adjustment of the coal lease royalty rate paid by Peabody Coal, now Peabody Energy. In July 1985, the newly appointed Hodel secretly met ex parte with Peabody's representative, "a former aide and friend of Secretary Hodel". After briefly reviewing the proposals' merits, Hodel approved lease amendments with royalty rates well below the rate that had previously been determined appropriate by the agencies responsible for monitoring the federal government's relations with Native Americans. In 2007, the US Court of Appeals for the Federal Circuit determined that those actions breached the government's duty of trust to the Nation and established a "cognizable money-mandating claim" against the government under the Indian Tucker Act.

== Post-government career ==
Hodel moved to Colorado, where he engaged in the energy consulting business and served on various charitable and corporate boards of directors. He is the author of Crisis in the Oil Patch (Regnery, 1995).

From June 1997 to February 1999, Hodel served as president of the Christian Coalition, a nonprofit conservative political group founded by religious broadcaster Pat Robertson.

From May 2003 to March 2005, Hodel served as president and CEO of Focus on the Family, a nonprofit evangelical Christian organization. He said his job was to manage the transition from the founder, James Dobson, to his successor. Several years before being named president, Hodel had served on its board, and he remained on the board until October 2005.

Hodel was also chairman of the company FreeEats.com, aka ccAdvertising, which has disseminated automated, interactive voice response (IVR) phone calls for conservative causes, the Economic Freedom Fund.

In 2026 Hodel released his autobiography, “Called To Serve: My Path to President Reagan’s Cabinet and Beyond” (Peak Press, 2026).

== Environmental efforts ==
As Secretary of the Interior, in 1985 Hodel ordered the acquisition of a ranch in southern Arizona that became the Buenos Aires National Wildlife Refuge. Encompassing approximately 118,000 acres (480 km^{2}) of savanna grassland in the Altar Valley, the refuge was created for the masked bobwhite quail. This refuge contains the United States' only population of the masked bobwhite quail.

As of 2023, Hodel serves as chairman emeritus at Summit Power Group, Inc., a Seattle-based developer of wind, solar, and gas-fired power plants. In 1989, he was the founder and managing director of Summit's predecessor company.

Political offices
Preceded by James B. Edwards	United States Secretary of Energy; 1982–1985	Succeeded by John S. Herrington
Preceded by William Clark	United States Secretary of the Interior; 1985–1989	Succeeded by Manuel Lujan Jr.
U.S. order of precedence (ceremonial)
Preceded by John Rusling Block as Former U.S. Cabinet Member	Order of precedence of the United States as Former U.S. Cabinet Member	Succeeded by Elizabeth Dole as Former U.S. Cabinet Member
