= Judiciary of American Samoa =

The Judiciary of American Samoa is defined under the Constitution of American Samoa and the American Samoa Code. It consists of the High Court of American Samoa, a District Court, and village courts, all under the administration and supervision of the Chief Justice. The High Court and District Court are both located in Fagatogo. The Chief Justice and the Associate Justice of the High Court are appointed by the United States Secretary of the Interior. Associate judges of the High Court, who may also serve in the village courts, and judges of the District Court are appointed by the Governor of American Samoa upon the recommendation of the Chief Justice and confirmed by the Senate.

American Samoa does not have a federal court like the Northern Mariana Islands, Guam, or the United States Virgin Islands. In general, under federal law, cases involving a federal crime committed outside of a judicial district are heard in the district in which the defendant is arrested or first brought to; or otherwise in the judicial district of the defendant’s last known residence; or if no such residence is known, in the District Court for the District of Columbia. Prior to a 2001 case, most such cases were brought to the District Court for the District of Columbia, but afterwards many cases were instead heard in the District Court for the District of Hawaii on the basis that this is where the defendant was "first brought".

== Courts ==
=== High Court ===
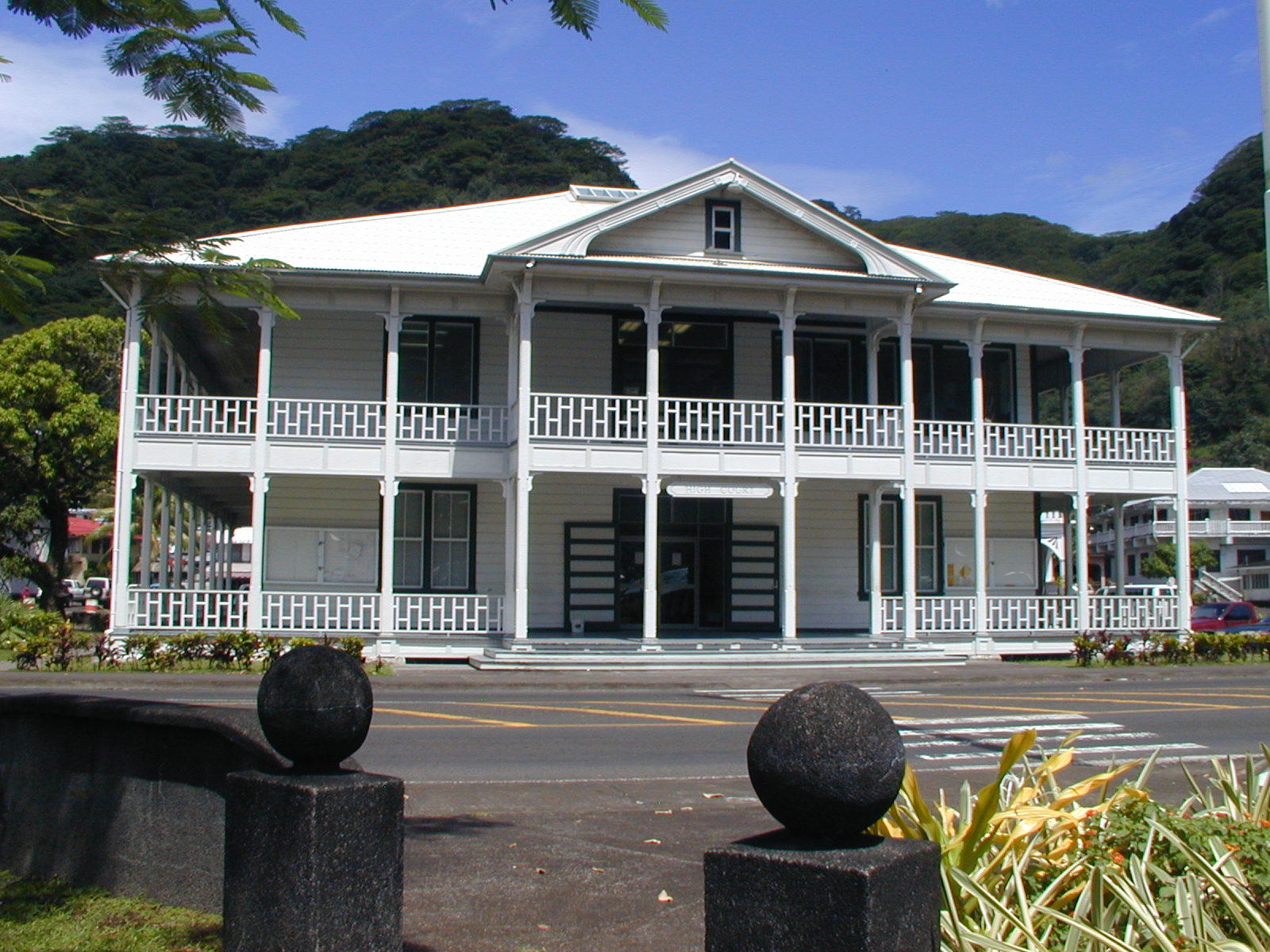
High Court of American Samoa building in Fagatogo

The High Court consists of four divisions: trial; land and titles; family, drug and alcohol; and appellate.

The trial division is empowered to hear, among other things, felony cases and civil cases in which the amount in controversy exceeds $15,000 and are not related to land or matai titles. Its sessions are held before one justice and one or two associate judges.

The land and titles division hears matters related to land and matai titles. Sessions regarding land are held before one justice and one or two associate judges, while sessions regarding matai titles are held before one justice and three or four associate judges.

The family, drug and alcohol division hears cases of juvenile offenses, family relations such as divorce, child support, paternity and adoption, domestic violence, alcohol and drug abuse. Its sessions are held before one justice and one or two associate judges.

The appellate division hears appeals from the other divisions, from the District Court or of administrative decisions. Its sessions are held before two or three justices (including Acting Associate Justices appointed by the Secretary of the Interior) and one or two associate judges.

=== District Court ===
The District Court hears matters such as misdemeanor offenses, civil cases in which the matter in controversy does not exceed $15,000 and are not related to land or matai titles, and traffic cases not involving a felony. Its sessions are conducted by only one judge.

=== Village courts ===
Each village has a court consisting of an associate judge of the High Court, who may serve in multiple villages. Each village court can only hear matters regarding its village regulations.

== Officers ==
=== Judges ===
The Chief Justice and the Associate Justice of the High Court are appointed by the United States Secretary of the Interior and are required to be trained in the law.

There are at least five associate judges of the High Court, who are appointed by the governor upon the recommendation of the Chief Justice and confirmed by the Senate. They are not required to have formal legal training. They may also be assigned to serve in village courts.

Since the 1970s the Secretary of the Interior has appointed federal judges, usually from the Ninth Circuit, to serve temporarily as Acting Associate Justices in the appellate division of the High Court of American Samoa.

There is at least one judge of the District Court, who is appointed by the governor upon the recommendation of the Chief Justice and confirmed by the Senate, and must also have formal legal training.

The Chief and Associate Justices, associate judges and District Court judges hold office for life with good behavior. However, the associate judges have a mandatory retirement age of 65, which may be waived by the governor.

=== Other ===
The American Samoa judiciary has other officers such as clerks, interpreters, marshals and probation officers.
