= High Court of American Samoa =

Highest court of American Samoa, after the U.S. Supreme Court

- Interactive map of High Court of American Samoa
- Established: 1921 (105 years ago)
- Jurisdiction: American Samoa
- Location: Fagatogo, American Samoa
- Composition method: Appointed by the United States Secretary of the Interior
- Authorized by: Constitution of American Samoa
- Appeals to: United States Secretary of the Interior (no appeals in practice)
- Number of positions: 2

Chief Justice
- Currently: Michael Kruse
- Since: 1988

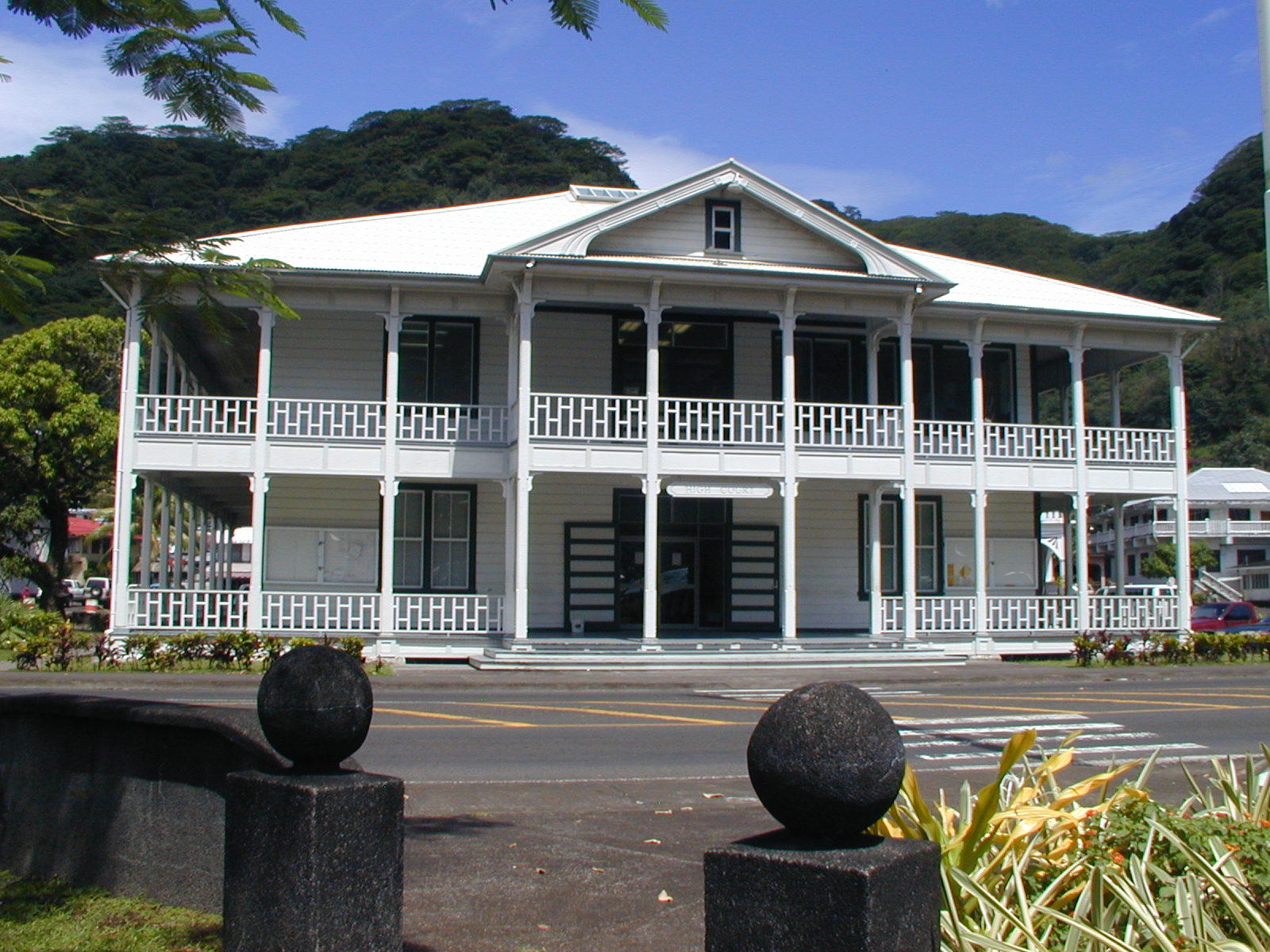
The High Court of American Samoa courthouse in 2008

The High Court of American Samoa is the highest court below the United States Supreme Court in American Samoa. The court is located in the capital of Fagatogo. It consists of one chief justice and one associate justice, appointed by the United States Secretary of the Interior, holding office during "good behavior" and removable for cause. As American Samoa has no local federal district court or territorial court, the High Court has also been granted the powers of a federal district court in certain matters while other federal matters are handled by the United States District Court for the District of Columbia and the United States District Court for the District of Hawaii.

The High Court of American Samoa also has several Samoan associate judges who sit with the two justices.

The Secretary of the Interior retains ultimate authority over the courts.

The colonial-style Maugaolii High Court served as the U.S. Navy headquarters during World War II.

== Organization ==
The High Court consists of four divisions:

- the trial division
- the land and titles division
- the family, drug and alcohol division
- the appellate division

The trial division, which consists of the Chief Justice, the Associate Justice, and associate judges, is a court of general jurisdiction, empowered to hear, among other things, felony cases and civil cases in which the amount in controversy exceeds $15,000 and are not related to land or matai titles. Its sessions are held before one justice and one or two associate judges.

The land and titles division hears matters related to land and matai titles. Sessions regarding land are held before one justice and one or two associate judges, while sessions regarding matai titles are held before one justice and three or four associate judges.

The family, drug and alcohol division hears cases of juvenile offenses, family relations such as divorce, child support, paternity and adoption, domestic violence, alcohol and drug abuse. Its sessions are held before one justice and one or two associate judges.

The appellate division hears appeals from the other divisions, from the District Court or of administrative decisions. Its sessions are held before two or three justices (including acting associate justices appointed by the Secretary of the Interior) and one or two associate judges.

== Justices ==
=== Current justices ===
Name	Start	Appointer	Law School
Michael Kruse, Chief Justice	November 1, 1988 (Note: Kruse was originally appointed as associate justice by Sec. Hodel on March 1, 1987 before being elevated to chief justice.)	Donald P. Hodel (R)	VUW; GWU (LLM)
Fiti A. Sunia	January 4, 2019	David Bernhardt (R)	Howard

=== Historical members ===
The past and present justices of the court:

Name	Associate Start	Associate End	Chief Start	Chief End	Appointer
Harry P. Wood	—	—	1921	1937	Albert B. Fall (under Harding)
Arthur A. Morrow	—	—	1937	1943	Harold L. Ickes (under F. Roosevelt)
Arthur A. Morrow	—	—	1945	1966	Harold L. Ickes (under F. Roosevelt)
V. G. Roel	1963	1966	—	—	Stewart Udall (under Kennedy)
Joseph W. Goss	1966	1970	—	—	Stewart Udall (under Johnson)
H. Edward Hydon	—	—	1966	1968	Stewart Udall (under Johnson)
Donald Hawk Crothers	—	—	1968	1972	Wally Hickel (under Nixon)
Leslie N. Jochimsen	1971	1975	1975	1976	Rogers Morton (under Nixon)
William J. McKnight III	—	—	1972	1975	Rogers Morton (under Nixon)
K. William O'Connor	1976	1977	1977	1978	Thomas S. Kleppe (under Ford)
Richard I. Miyamoto	1976	1978	1978	1981	Thomas S. Kleppe (under Ford) (Associate Justice); Cecil Andrus (under Carter) (Chief Justice)
Thomas W. Murphy	1980	1987	—	—	Cecil Andrus (under Carter)
Robert Gardner	—	—	1981	1986	James G. Watt (under Reagan)
Grover J. Rees III	1988	1991	1986	1988	William P. Clark Jr. (under Reagan) (Chief Justice); Donald P. Hodel (under Reagan) (Associate Justice)
Michael Kruse	1987	1988	1988	present	Donald P. Hodel (under Reagan)
Lyle L. Richmond	1991	2017	—	—	Manuel Lujan Jr. (under G.H.W. Bush)
Fiti A. Sunia	2019	present	—	—	David Bernhardt (under Trump)

== Decisions ==
In Craddick v. Territorial Registrar (1980), the court upheld "the territory’s blood quantum-based land alienation laws", which protect persons of Samoan ancestry, are valid, to wit:

It is prohibited to alienate any lands except freehold lands to any person who has less than one half native blood, and if a person has any nonnative blood whatever, it is prohibited to alienate any native lands to such person unless he was born in American Samoa, is a descendant of a Samoan, lived in American Samoa for more than five years and has [1ASR2d12] officially declared his intention of making American Samoa his home for life.

In 2024, the High Court ruled in the case of Wiesner v. Fainu’ulelei that the Second Amendment right to bear arms does not apply in American Samoa.

== See also ==
- Judiciary of American Samoa
- Article I and Article III tribunals#Article IV tribunals
