= 2020 United States gubernatorial elections =

- November 3, 2020

13 governorships 11 states; 2 territories
	Majority party	Minority party
Party	Republican	Democratic
Seats before	26	24
Seats after	27	23
Seat change	▲1	▼1
Popular vote	10,698,657	9,001,081
Percentage	52.41%	44.09%
Seats up	7	4
Seats won	8	3
- Democratic hold Republican hold Republican gain New Progressive hold Nonpartisan politician

United States gubernatorial elections were held on November 3, 2020, in 11 states and two territories. The previous gubernatorial elections for this group of states took place in 2016, except in New Hampshire and Vermont where governors only serve two-year terms. These two states elected their current governors in 2018. Nine state governors ran for reelection and all nine won, (Note: Mike Parson of Missouri, who took office in 2018 after the resignation of Eric Greitens, was elected to his first full term.) while Democrat Steve Bullock of Montana could not run again due to term limits and Republican Gary Herbert of Utah decided to retire at the end of his term.

In addition to state gubernatorial elections, the territories of American Samoa and Puerto Rico also held elections for their governors. Puerto Rican governor Wanda Vázquez Garced lost the New Progressive Party primary to Pedro Pierluisi, while Lolo Matalasi Moliga of American Samoa could not run again due to term limits.

The elections took place concurrently with the 2020 presidential election, elections to the House of Representatives and Senate, and numerous state and local elections. This round of gubernatorial elections marked the first time since West Virginia governor Jim Justice's party switch in mid-2017 that Republicans flipped any governorships held previously by Democrats, and the first round of gubernatorial elections since 2016 where Republicans made net gains, ending a streak of three years of Democratic net gains that had occurred in prior elections during the presidency of Republican Donald Trump.

As of 2026, this is the last time that Democrats won the governorship in American Samoa and Puerto Rico.

== Pre-election composition ==
Montana was considered the most competitive race in this cycle and was rated a tossup by four of six major pundits. Incumbent Democratic governor Steve Bullock was term-limited, but his lieutenant governor, Mike Cooney, a longtime political figure in the state since 1977, was the Democratic nominee. The Republican nominee was Montana at-large congressman Greg Gianforte, who is a controversial figure because he was arrested for body-slamming a reporter the day of a 2017 special election.. The Bullock administration had an approval rating of 52% and a disapproval of 31%, according to a poll by the Morning Consult, meaning Cooney's election chances were higher in the otherwise solidly Republican state. North Carolina was the next most competitive race, as it is a Republican-leaning swing state with a Democratic governor, Roy Cooper, meaning that Cooper faced a tough reelection. Cooper won his 2016 election by a mere 10,277 votes, or 0.22%. However, most forecasters gave the race a Democratic lean as Cooper had an approval rating of 59%. Cooper had also lead most polls against his Republican challenger, Dan Forest, by an average of a 11-point lead, according to RealClearPolitics.

Vermont and New Hampshire are both races that could have become competitive as they are Democratic states with Republican governors in a presidential year. However, Republican incumbents Phil Scott of Vermont and Chris Sununu of New Hampshire are ranked among the most popular governors in the United States, and both races were rated likely to be safe Republican. Both are viewed as centrists who attract Democratic and independent voters. Scott's challenger was David Zuckerman, the state's lieutenant governor, who ran on both the Democratic and Progressive nominations. Zuckerman had been endorsed by Vermont U.S. senator Bernie Sanders. Sununu was running against New Hampshire Senate Majority Leader Dan Feltes.

In Missouri, Republican incumbent Mike Parson assumed office after the resignation of Eric Greitens due to sexual harassment and violations of campaign finance laws, and his lack of name recognition and unpopularity could have made his race against state auditor Nicole Galloway, Missouri's only Democratic statewide office holder, competitive, though most forecasters still rated the race as lean Republican due to Missouri's heavy Republican lean. West Virginia’s gubernatorial race was seen as safe for Republicans because the state heavily leans Republican, but some forecasts rated it as likely Republican due to corruption allegations against incumbent Jim Justice that have led to rising unpopularity. Justice faced centrist Democrat Ben Salango, who was endorsed by U.S. senator Joe Manchin and multiple local unions.

The gubernatorial races for John Carney in Delaware and Jay Inslee in Washington were seen as safe for Democrats, while the races for Eric Holcomb in Indiana, Doug Burgum in North Dakota, and Spencer Cox in Utah were seen as safe for Republicans.

== Election predictions ==
Several sites and individuals published predictions of competitive seats. These predictions looked at factors such as the strength of the incumbent (if the incumbent is running for re-election), the strength of the candidates, and the partisan leanings of the state (reflected in part by the state's Cook Partisan Voting Index rating). The predictions assigned ratings to each seat, with the rating indicating the predicted advantage that a party has in winning that seat.

Most election predictors use:

- "tossup": no advantage
- "tilt" (used by some predictors): advantage that is not quite as strong as "lean"
- "lean": slight advantage
- "likely": significant, but surmountable, advantage
- "safe": near-certain chance of victory

State	PVI	Incumbent	Last race	Cook Oct 23, 2020	IE Oct 28, 2020	Sabato Nov 2, 2020	Politico Nov 2, 2020	Daily Kos Oct 28, 2020	RCP Jul 29, 2020	270towin Oct 23, 2020	Result
Delaware	D+6	John Carney	58.3% D	Safe D	Safe D	Safe D	Safe D	Safe D	Safe D	Safe D	Carney; 59.5% D
Indiana	R+9	Eric Holcomb	51.4% R	Safe R	Safe R	Safe R	Likely R	Safe R	Safe R	Safe R	Holcomb; 56.5% R
Missouri	R+9	Mike Parson	51.1% R	Lean R	Lean R	Lean R	Lean R	Likely R	Lean R	Lean R	Parson; 57.1% R
Montana	R+11	Steve Bullock (term-limited)	50.2% D	Tossup	Tossup	Lean R (flip)	Lean R (flip)	Lean R (flip)	Tossup	Tossup	Gianforte; 54.4% R (flip)
New Hampshire	EVEN	Chris Sununu	52.8% R	Safe R	Likely R	Likely R	Likely R	Safe R	Likely R	Likely R	Sununu; 65.1% R
North Carolina	R+3	Roy Cooper	49.0% D	Likely D	Lean D	Likely D	Lean D	Likely D	Lean D	Likely D	Cooper; 51.5% D
North Dakota	R+16	Doug Burgum	76.5% R	Safe R	Safe R	Safe R	Safe R	Safe R	Safe R	Safe R	Burgum; 65.8% R
Utah	R+20	Gary Herbert (retiring)	66.7% R	Safe R	Safe R	Safe R	Safe R	Safe R	Safe R	Safe R	Cox; 63.0% R
Vermont	D+15	Phil Scott	55.2% R	Safe R	Safe R	Safe R	Likely R	Safe R	Likely R	Safe R	Scott; 68.5% R
Washington	D+7	Jay Inslee	54.2% D	Safe D	Safe D	Safe D	Safe D	Safe D	Safe D	Safe D	Inslee; 56.6% D
West Virginia	R+19	Jim Justice	49.1% D (Note: Governor Jim Justice was originally elected as a Democrat before switching back to a Republican in 2017. Justice ran for re-election as a Republican.)	Safe R	Safe R	Likely R	Likely R	Safe R	Safe R	Likely R	Justice; 63.5% R

== Closest races ==
States where the margin of victory was between 1% and 5%:

1. Puerto Rico, 1.37%
2. North Carolina, 4.51%

Red denotes races won by Republicans. Blue denotes races won by Democrats. Dark blue denotes race won by New Progressives.

== Summary ==
=== States ===
State	Incumbent	Party	First elected	Result	Candidates
Delaware	John Carney	Democratic	2016	Incumbent re-elected.	▌ ✓ John Carney (Democratic) 59.5%; ▌Julianne Murray (Republican) 38.6%; ▌Kathy DeMatteis (Independent) 1.2%
Indiana	Eric Holcomb	Republican	2016	Incumbent re-elected.	▌ ✓ Eric Holcomb (Republican) 56.5%; ▌Woody Myers (Democratic) 32.1%; ▌Donald Rainwater (Libertarian) 11.4%
Missouri	Mike Parson	Republican	2018 (Note: Parson took office after his predecessor (Eric Greitens) resigned.)	Incumbent elected to full term.	▌ ✓ Mike Parson (Republican) 57.1%; ▌Nicole Galloway (Democratic) 40.7%; ▌Rik Combs (Libertarian) 1.6%
Montana	Steve Bullock	Democratic	2012	Incumbent term-limited. Republican gain.	▌ ✓ Greg Gianforte (Republican) 54.4%; ▌Mike Cooney (Democratic) 41.6%; ▌Lyman Bishop (Libertarian) 4.0%
New Hampshire	Chris Sununu	Republican	2016	Incumbent re-elected.	▌ ✓ Chris Sununu (Republican) 65.1%; ▌Dan Feltes (Democratic) 33.4%; ▌Darryl W. Perry (Libertarian) 1.4%
North Carolina	Roy Cooper	Democratic	2016	Incumbent re-elected.	▌ ✓ Roy Cooper (Democratic) 51.5%; ▌Dan Forest (Republican) 47.0%; ▌Steven J. DiFiore (Libertarian) 1.1%
North Dakota	Doug Burgum	Republican	2016	Incumbent re-elected.	▌ ✓ Doug Burgum (Republican) 65.8%; ▌Shelley Lenz (Democratic–NPL) 25.4%; ▌DuWayne Hendrickson (Libertarian) 3.9%
Utah	Gary Herbert	Republican	2009 (Note: Herbert took office after his predecessor (Jon Huntsman Jr.) resigned. He was subsequently elected in the 2010 Utah gubernatorial special election.)	Incumbent retired. Republican hold.	▌ ✓ Spencer Cox (Republican) 63.0%; ▌Christopher Peterson (Democratic) 30.3%; ▌Daniel Cottam (Libertarian) 3.5%; ▌Gregory Duerden (Independent American) 1.8%
Vermont	Phil Scott	Republican	2016	Incumbent re-elected.	▌ ✓ Phil Scott (Republican) 68.5%; ▌David Zuckerman (Progressive) 27.3%; ▌Kevin Hoyt (Independent) 1.3%; ▌Emily Peyton (Independent) 1.0%
Washington	Jay Inslee	Democratic	2012	Incumbent re-elected.	▌ ✓ Jay Inslee (Democratic) 56.6%; ▌Loren Culp (Republican) 43.1%
West Virginia	Jim Justice	Republican (Note: Justice was originally elected as a Democrat in 2016 and changed parties to Republican in 2017.)	2016	Incumbent re-elected.	▌ ✓ Jim Justice (Republican) 63.5%; ▌Ben Salango (Democratic) 30.2%; ▌Erika Kolenich (Libertarian) 2.9%; ▌S. Marshall Wilson (Independent/write-in) 1.9%; ▌Daniel Lutz (Mountain) 1.4%

=== Territories ===
Territory	Incumbent	Party	First elected	Result	Candidates
American Samoa	Lolo Matalasi Moliga	Democratic (Note: The governor of American Samoa is elected on a non-partisan basis, although individuals do affiliate with national parties, in Moliga and Mauga's cases with the Democratic Party and in Sao's case with the Republican Party.)	2012	Incumbent term-limited. Democratic hold.	▌ ✓ Lemanu Peleti Mauga (Nonpartisan) 60.3%; ▌Gaoteote Palaie Tofau (Nonpartisan) 21.9%; ▌Iʻaulualo Faʻafetai Talia (Nonpartisan) 12.3%; ▌Nuanuaolefeagaiga Saoluaga T. Nua (Nonpartisan) 5.5%
Puerto Rico	Wanda Vázquez Garced	New Progressive (Note: Wanda Vázquez affiliates with the Republican Party on the national level; Pedro Pierluisi affiliates with the Democratic Party on the national level.)	2019 (Note: Vázquez Garced took office after her predecessor (Ricardo Rosselló) resigned.)	Incumbent lost nomination. New Progressive hold.	▌ ✓ Pedro Pierluisi (PNP) 32.9%; ▌Carlos Delgado Altieri (PPD) 31.6%; ▌Alexandra Lúgaro (MVC) 14.2%; ▌Juan Dalmau (PIP) 13.7%; ▌César Vázquez (PD) 6.9%

== Election dates ==
These were the election dates for the regularly scheduled general elections.

State	Filing deadline	Primary election	Primary run-off (if necessary)	General election	Poll closing (Eastern Time)
Delaware	July 14, 2020	September 15, 2020	N/A	November 3, 2020	8:00pm
Indiana	February 7, 2020	June 2, 2020	N/A	November 3, 2020	6:00pm
Missouri	March 31, 2020	August 4, 2020	N/A	November 3, 2020	8:00pm
Montana	March 9, 2020	June 2, 2020	N/A	November 3, 2020	10:00pm
New Hampshire	June 12, 2020	September 8, 2020	N/A	November 3, 2020	8:00pm
North Carolina	December 20, 2019	March 3, 2020	June 23, 2020	November 3, 2020	7:30pm
North Dakota	April 6, 2020	June 9, 2020	N/A	November 3, 2020	10:00pm
Utah	March 19, 2020	June 30, 2020	N/A	November 3, 2020	10:00pm
Vermont	May 28, 2020	August 11, 2020	N/A	November 3, 2020	7:00pm
Washington	May 15, 2020	August 4, 2020	N/A	November 3, 2020	11:00pm
West Virginia	January 25, 2020	June 9, 2020	N/A	November 3, 2020	7:30pm
American Samoa	September 1, 2020	N/A	N/A	November 3, 2020	3:00am
Puerto Rico	January 5, 2020	August 16, 2020 (Note: Because of a lack of ballots at about half of Puerto Rico's 110 voting locations, the August 9 primaries were suspended until August 16.)	N/A	November 3, 2020	4:00pm

== Delaware ==
2020 Delaware gubernatorial election
- November 3, 2020
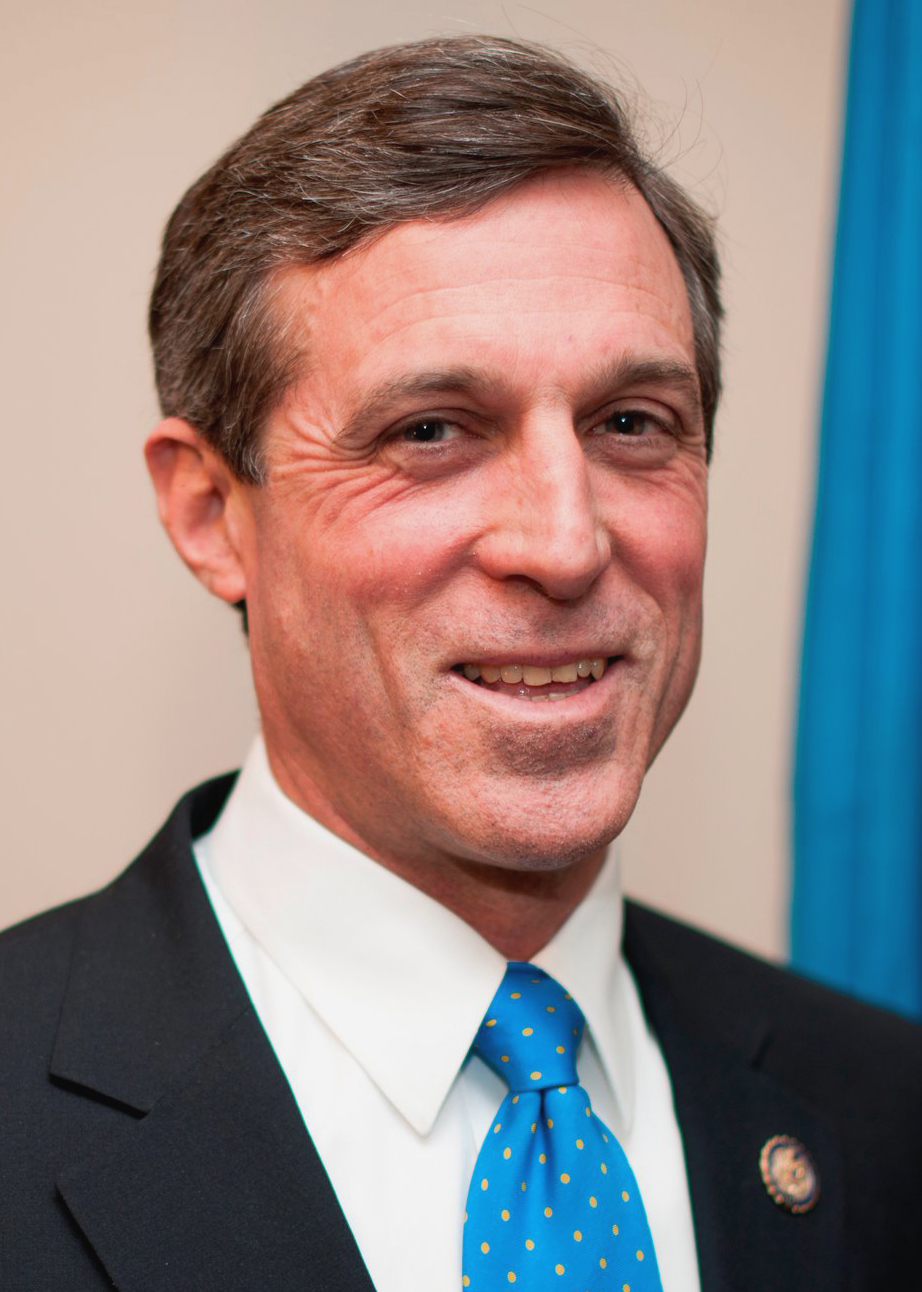

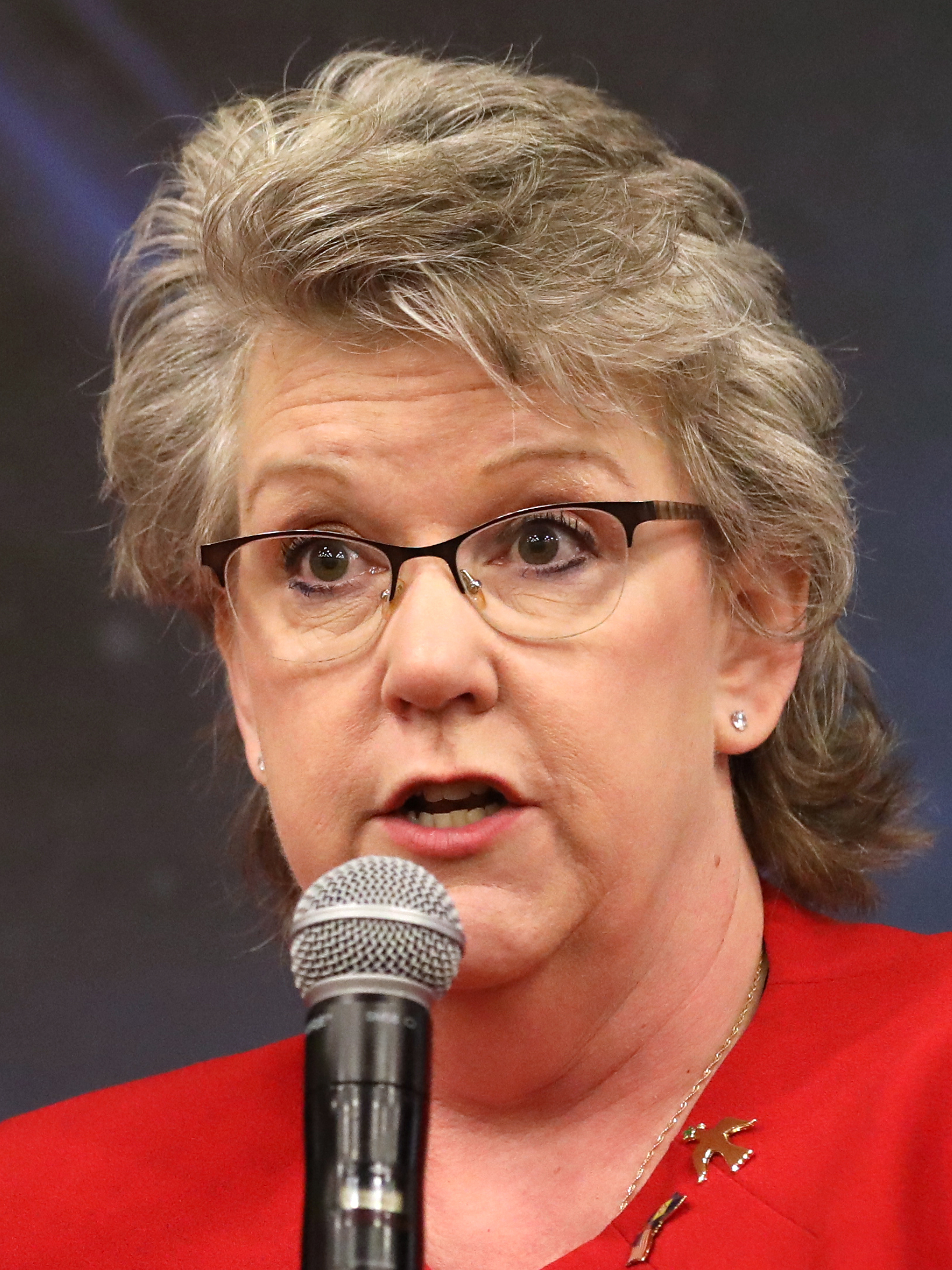
Nominee	John Carney	Julianne Murray
Party	Democratic	Republican
Popular vote	292,903	190,312
Percentage	59.5%	38.6%
- County results Carney: 50–60% 60–70% Murray: 50–60%
Governor before election
John Carney
Democratic
Elected Governor
John Carney
Democratic

One-term incumbent Democrat John Carney ran for re-election to a second term. Primaries took place on September 15. Carney decisively defeated progressive community activist and environmentalist David Lamar Williams, Jr. in the Democratic primary. Multiple candidates ran in the Republican primary, including attorney Julianne Murray, Delaware state senator from the 16th district Colin Bonini, small business owner David Bosco, local Republican politician David Graham, Delaware state senator from the 21st district Bryant Richardson, and perennial candidate Scott Walker. Murray narrowly defeated Bonini with a plurality of the vote. Carney won reelection by a large margin.

Delaware Democratic primary
Party	Candidate	Votes	%
Democratic	John Carney (incumbent)	101,142	84.77
Democratic	David Lamar Williams, Jr.	18,169	15.23
Total votes		119,311	100.00

Delaware Republican primary
Party	Candidate	Votes	%
Republican	Julianne Murray	22,819	41.15
Republican	Colin Bonini	19,161	34.56
Republican	Bryant Richardson	4,262	7.69
Republican	Scott Walker	3,998	7.21
Republican	David Bosco	3,660	6.60
Republican	David Graham	1,547	2.79
Total votes		55,447	100.00

Delaware general election
Party	Candidate	Votes	%	±%
Democratic	John Carney (incumbent)	292,903	59.46%	+1.12
Republican	Julianne Murray	190,312	38.63%	–0.55
Independent Party	Kathy DeMatteis	6,150	1.25%	N/A
Libertarian	John Machurek	3,270	0.66%	–0.43
Total votes		492,635	100.00%	
Democratic hold				

== Indiana ==
2020 Indiana gubernatorial election
- November 3, 2020
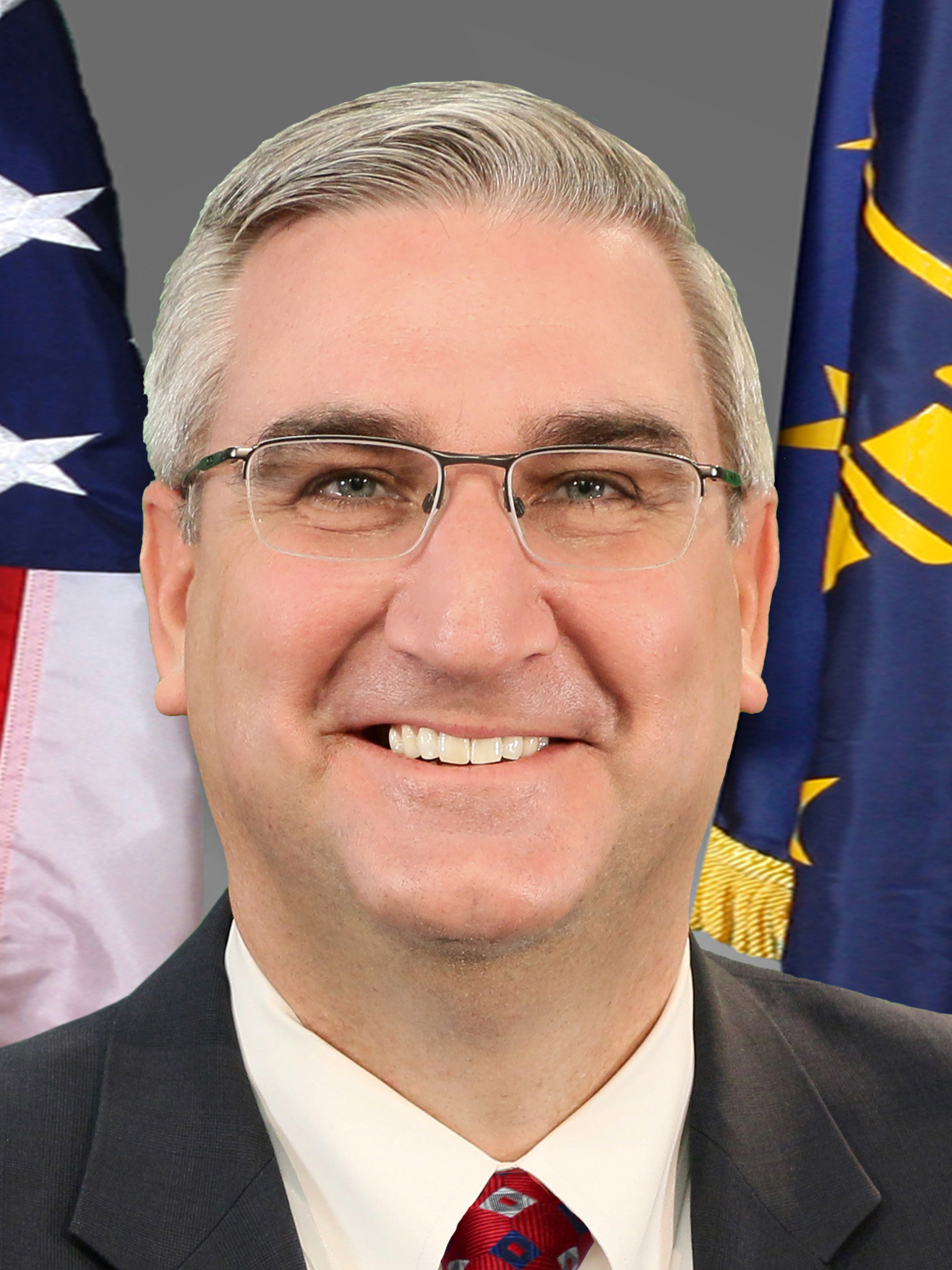

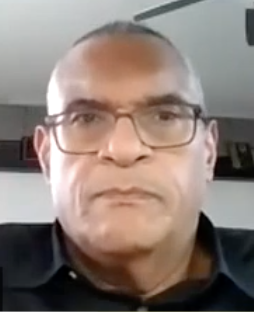

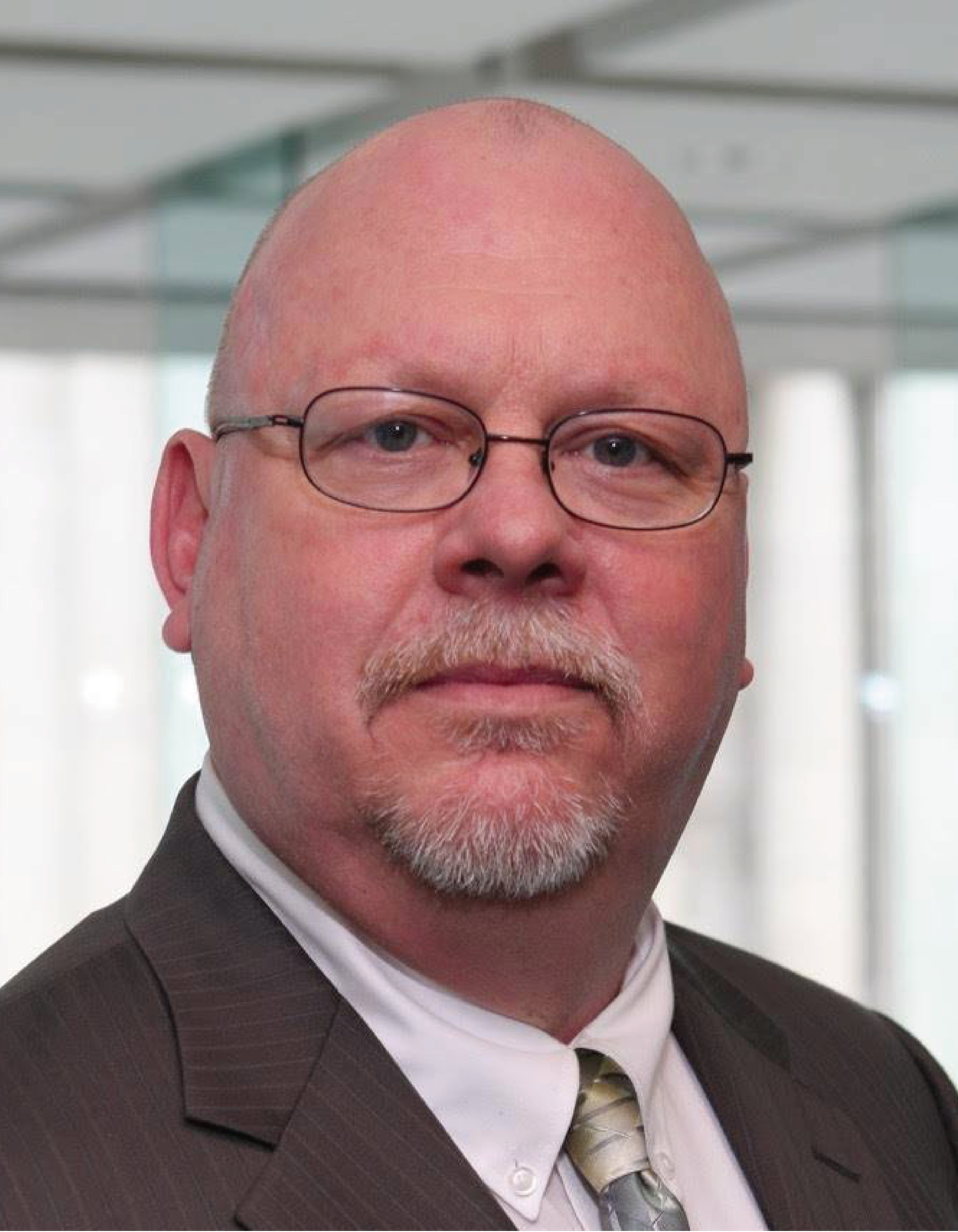
Nominee	Eric Holcomb	Woody Myers	Donald Rainwater
Party	Republican	Democratic	Libertarian
Running mate	Suzanne Crouch	Linda Lawson	William Henry
Popular vote	1,706,727	968,094	345,569
Percentage	56.5%	32.1%	11.4%
- County results Holcomb: 50-60% 60-70% 70-80% Myers: 50-60%
Governor before election
Eric Holcomb
Republican
Elected Governor
Eric Holcomb
Republican

One-term incumbent Republican Eric Holcomb ran for re-election in 2020 alongside his running mate Suzanne Crouch. Holcomb ran against the Democratic nominee, former Health Commissioner of Indiana Woody Myers, and his running mate Linda Lawson, the former Minority Leader of the Indiana House of Representatives. Donald Rainwater, a U.S. Navy veteran, was the Libertarian nominee. Primaries were held on June 2, although both Holcomb and Myers ran uncontested. Holcomb won the election in a landslide, though Libertarian Donald Rainwater's 11% of the vote was the highest percentage of vote for a third-party candidate in any of the 2020 gubernatorial race, and the highest any Libertarian candidate ever received in Indiana in a three-party race (The 2006 United States Senate election in Indiana saw the Libertarian candidate take 12.6% of the vote, but there was no Democratic candidate running).

Indiana Republican primary
Party	Candidate	Votes	%
Republican	Eric Holcomb (incumbent)	524,495	100.00
Total votes		524,495	100.00

Indiana Democratic primary
Party	Candidate	Votes	%
Democratic	Woody Myers	408,230	100.00
Total votes		408,230	100.00

Indiana general election
Party	Candidate	Votes	%	±%
Republican	Eric Holcomb (incumbent)	1,706,727	56.51%	+5.13
Democratic	Woody Myers	968,094	32.05%	–13.37
Libertarian	Donald Rainwater	345,569	11.44%	+8.24
Total votes		3,020,414	100.00%	
Republican hold				

== Missouri ==
2020 Missouri gubernatorial election
- November 3, 2020
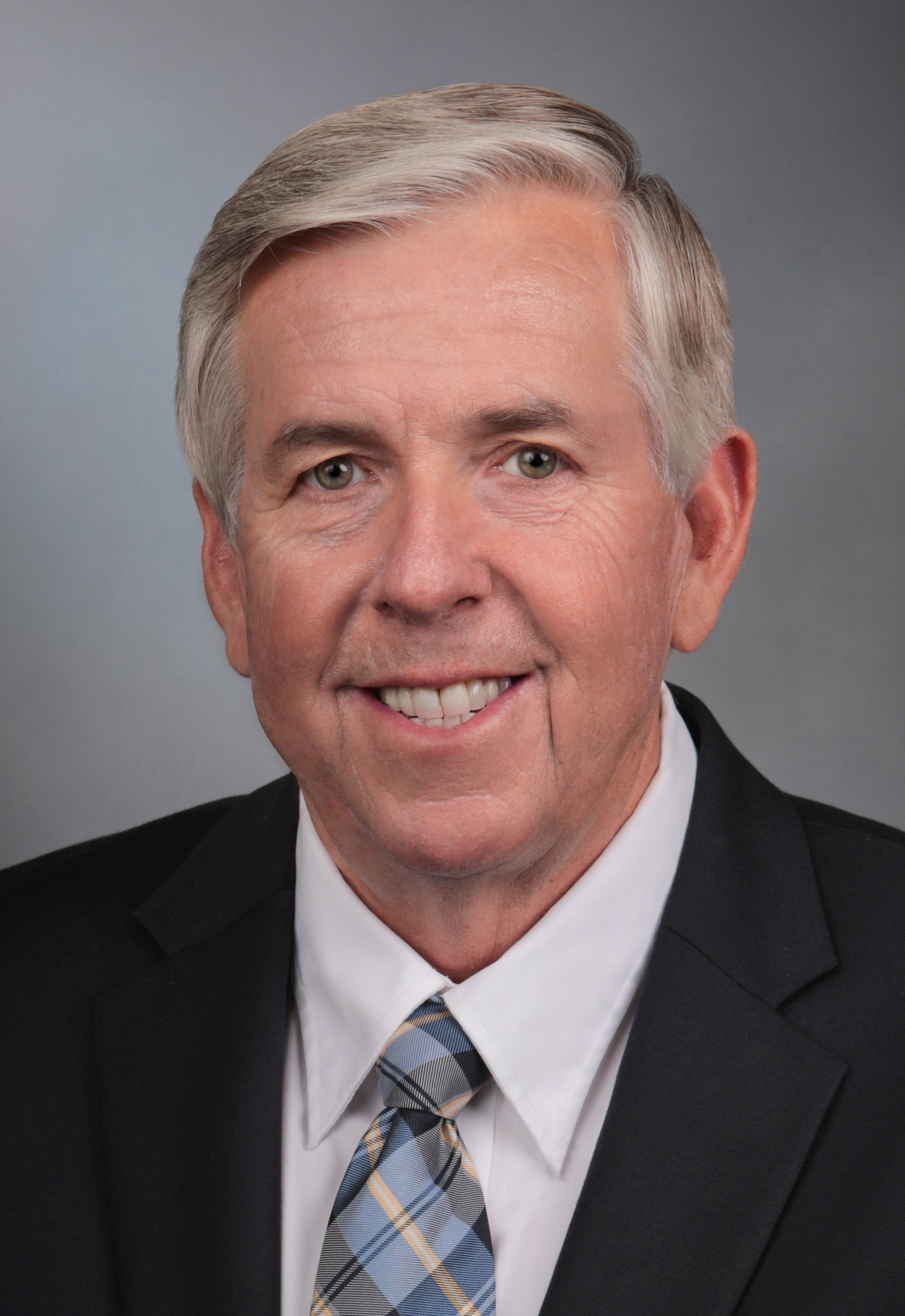

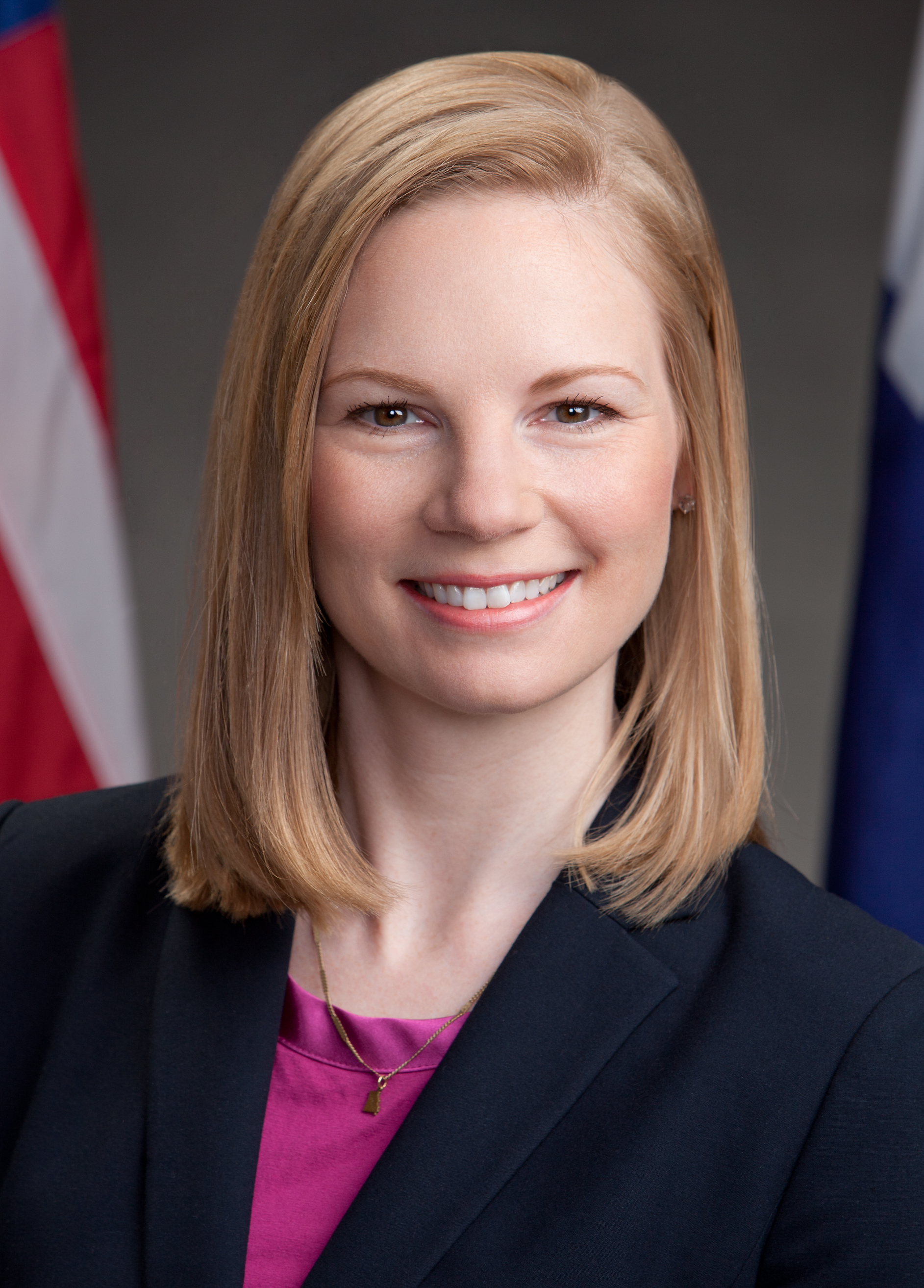
Nominee	Mike Parson	Nicole Galloway
Party	Republican	Democratic
Popular vote	1,720,202	1,225,771
Percentage	57.1%	40.7%
- Preliminary County results Parson: 50-60% 60-70% 70-80% 80-90% Galloway: 50-60% 80–90%
Governor before election
Mike Parson
Republican
Elected Governor
Mike Parson
Republican

One-term incumbent Republican Mike Parson took office upon Eric Greitens' resignation due to threatening the dissemination of sexual images and campaign finance violations. Parson ran for election to a full term in 2020 and easily won the Republican primary. State auditor Nicole Galloway, Missouri's only Democratic statewide office holder, won the Democratic primary, defeating pastor Eric Morrison, and multiple other candidates including Jimmie Matthews, Antoin Johnson, and Robin Quaethem. Primaries took place on August 4. The Libertarian nominee was U.S. Air Force veteran Rik Combs, while Jerome Bauer was the Green Party nominee. Both candidates ran uncontested in their respective primaries. Despite predictions that this election could be close and that Parson could underperform national Republicans in the state, Parson won handily.

Missouri Republican primary
Party	Candidate	Votes	%
Republican	Mike Parson (incumbent)	510,471	74.93
Republican	Saundra McDowell	84,191	12.36
Republican	Jim Neely	59,451	8.73
Republican	Raleigh Ritter	27,181	4.00
Total votes		681,294	100.00

Missouri Democratic primary
Party	Candidate	Votes	%
Democratic	Nicole Galloway	453,331	84.63
Democratic	Eric Morrison	32,266	6.02
Democratic	Jimmie Matthews	20,458	3.82
Democratic	Antoin Johnson	20,169	3.76
Democratic	Robin Quaethem	9,452	1.76
Total votes		535,676	100.00

Missouri general election
Party	Candidate	Votes	%	±%
Republican	Mike Parson (incumbent)	1,720,202	57.11%	+5.97
Democratic	Nicole Galloway	1,225,771	40.69%	–4.88
Libertarian	Rik Combs	49,067	1.63%	+0.16
Green	Jerome Bauer	17,234	0.57%	–0.18
Write-in		13	0.00%	±0.00
Total votes		3,012,287	100.00%	
Republican hold				

== Montana ==
2020 Montana gubernatorial election
- November 3, 2020
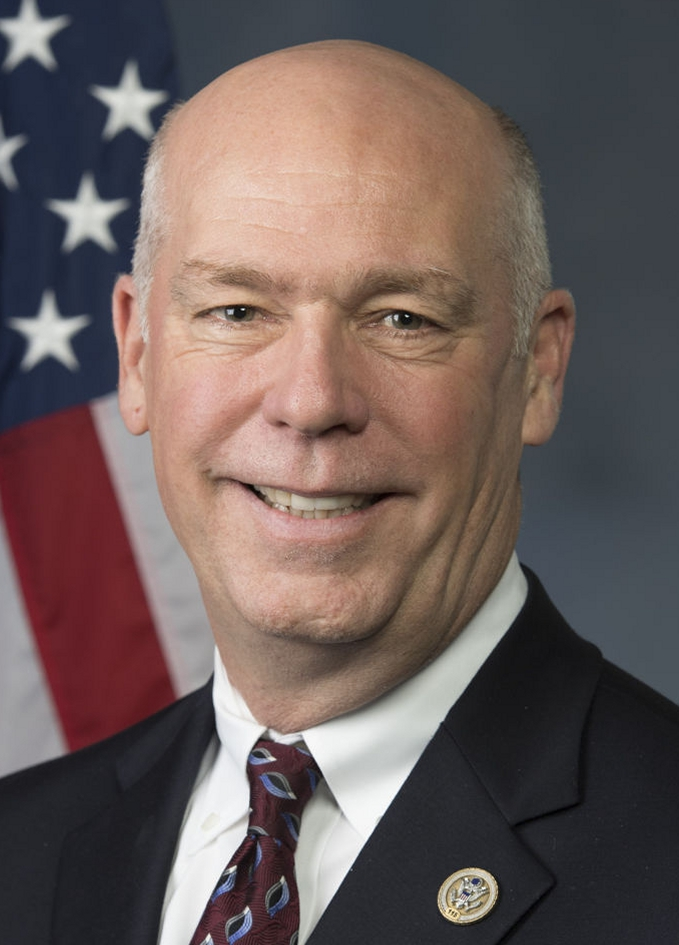

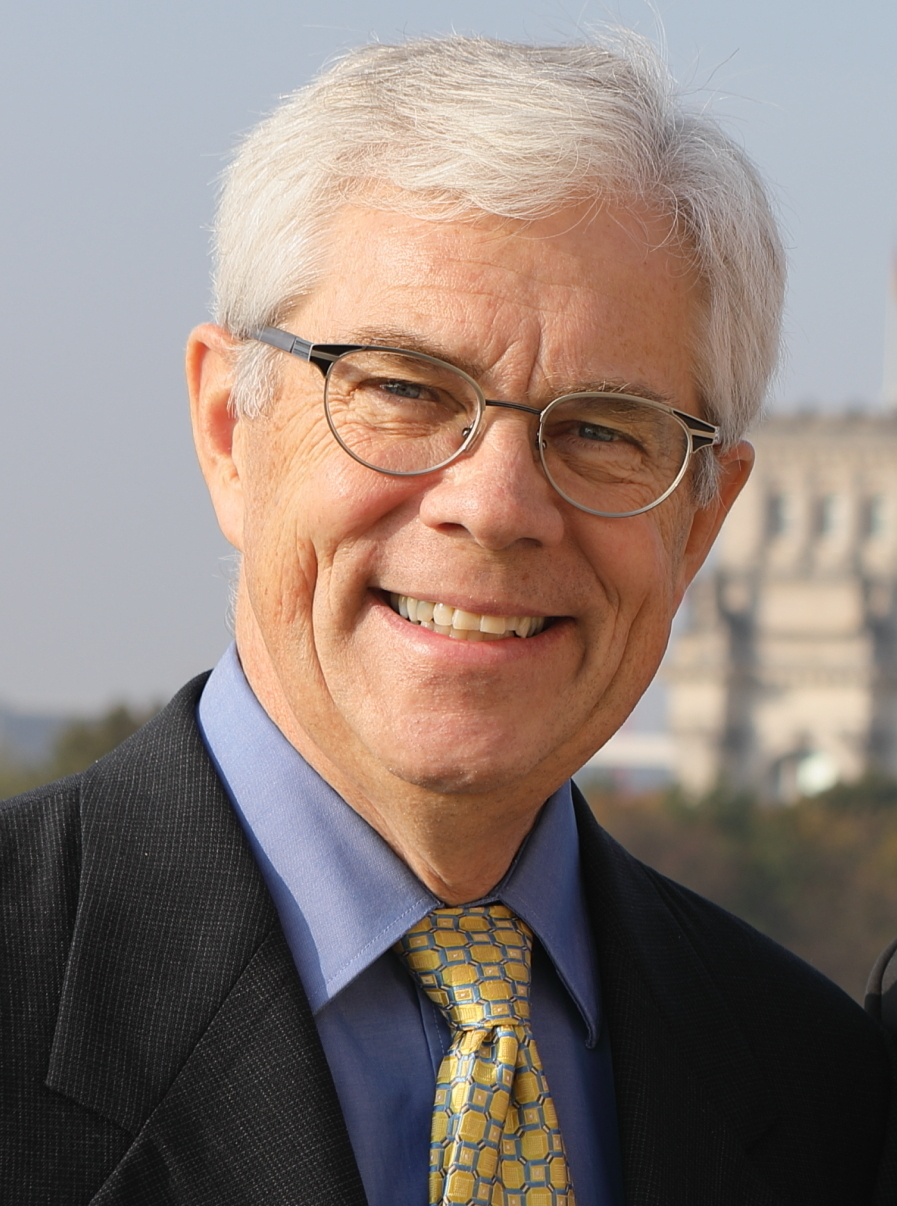
Nominee	Greg Gianforte	Mike Cooney
Party	Republican	Democratic
Running mate	Kristen Juras	Casey Schreiner
Popular vote	328,548	250,860
Percentage	54.4%	41.6%
- County results Gianforte: 50–60% 60–70% 70–80% 80–90% >90% Cooney: 40–50% 50–60% 60–70%
Governor before election
Steve Bullock
Democratic
Elected Governor
Greg Gianforte
Republican

Two-term incumbent Democrat Steve Bullock was term-limited in 2020, making him the only incumbent governor in the United States (not counting U.S. territories) who was term-limited in this election year. This was therefore an open-seat election, and viewed as the most competitive gubernatorial election in the 2020 cycle. Primaries were held on June 2, with heavy competition in both. Bullock's lieutenant governor, Mike Cooney, a longtime local politician, was the Democratic nominee, defeating businesswoman and daughter of former U.S. representative Pat Williams, Whitney Williams, in the Democratic primary. Cooney's running mate was Minority Leader of the Montana House of Representatives, Casey Schreiner. The Republican nominee was Montana's at-large congressman Greg Gianforte, who defeated Attorney General Tim Fox and state senator from the 6th district, Albert Olszewski. Gianforte's running mate was Kristen Juras, a businesswoman and attorney. Gianforte was a controversial figure in the state, as he was arrested for body slamming a reporter the day of a 2017 special election. Despite predictions that this election would be close, Gianforte won by 12 points, making this the first time Montana has voted for a Republican for governor since 2000. This was the only gubernatorial seat to change parties in 2020.

Montana Democratic primary
Party	Candidate	Votes	%
Democratic	Mike Cooney	81,527	54.86
Democratic	Whitney Williams	67,066	45.14
Total votes		148,593	100.00

Montana Republican primary
Party	Candidate	Votes	%
Republican	Greg Gianforte	119,247	53.44
Republican	Tim Fox	60,823	27.26
Republican	Albert Olszewski	43,062	19.30
Total votes		223,132	100.00

Montana general election
Party	Candidate	Votes	%	±%
Republican	Greg Gianforte	328,548	54.43%	+8.08
Democratic	Mike Cooney	250,860	41.56%	–8.69
Libertarian	Lyman Bishop	24,179	4.01%	+0.61
Total votes		603,587	100.00%	
Republican gain from Democratic				

== New Hampshire ==
2020 New Hampshire gubernatorial election
- November 3, 2020
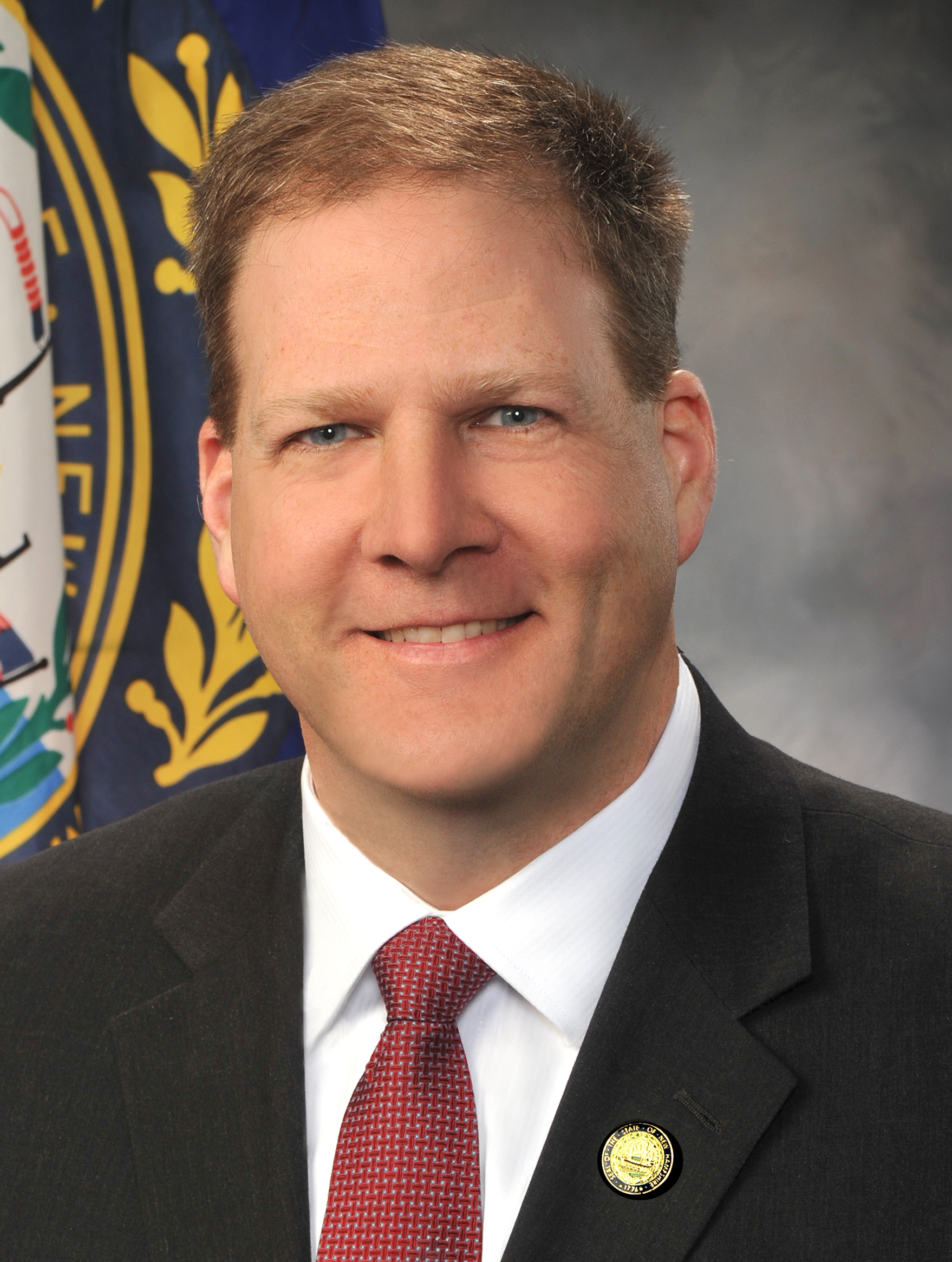

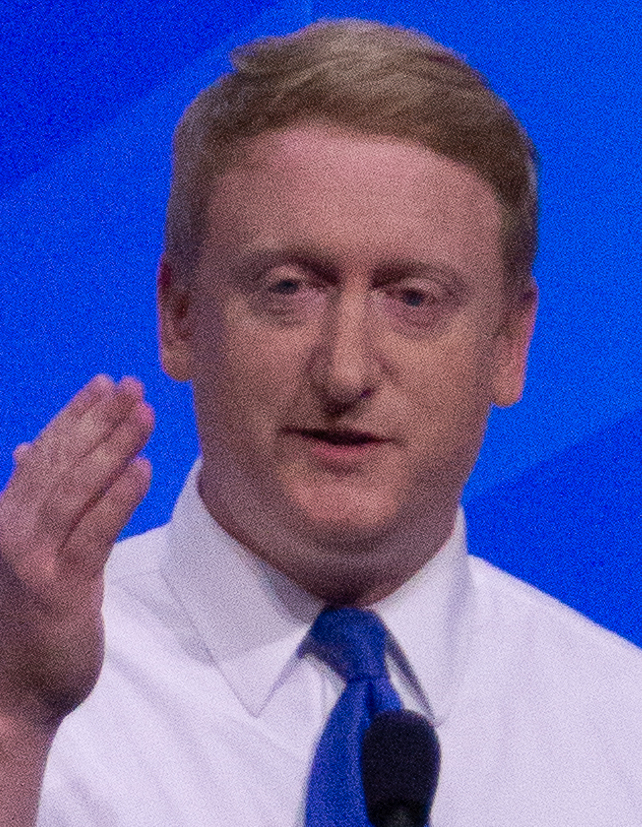
Nominee	Chris Sununu	Dan Feltes
Party	Republican	Democratic
Popular vote	516,609	264,639
Percentage	65.1%	33.4%
- County results Sununu: 50–60% 60–70% 70–80%
Governor before election
Chris Sununu
Republican
Elected Governor
Chris Sununu
Republican

New Hampshire is one of two states, alongside Vermont, that has two-year terms for their governors instead of four-year terms, meaning they held their gubernatorial latest elections in 2018. In December 2019, two-term incumbent Republican Chris Sununu announced that he would run for a third two-year term in 2020, ending speculation he would choose to run for the U.S. Senate instead. Sununu easily defeated Franklin city counselor Karen Testerman in the Republican primary. In a hotly contested Democratic primary, Majority Leader of the New Hampshire Senate Dan Feltes narrowly defeated Andru Volinsky, a member of the Executive Council of New Hampshire from the 2nd district. The primaries took place on September 8. Despite national Democrats winning by large margins in the state's presidential, senate, and house races, Sununu won by a large margin based on his popularity with voters of both parties.

New Hampshire Republican primary
Party	Candidate	Votes	%
Republican	Chris Sununu (incumbent)	130,703	89.67
Republican	Karen Testerman	13,589	9.32
Republican	Nobody	1,239	0.85
Write-in		226	0.15
Total votes		145,757	100.00

New Hampshire Democratic primary
Party	Candidate	Votes	%
Democratic	Dan Feltes	72,318	50.90
Democratic	Andru Volinsky	65,455	46.06
Write-in		4,321	3.04
Total votes		142,094	100.00

New Hampshire general election
Party	Candidate	Votes	%	±%
Republican	Chris Sununu (incumbent)	516,609	65.12%	+12.34
Democratic	Dan Feltes	264,639	33.36%	–12.38
Libertarian	Darryl W. Perry	11,329	1.43%	±0.00
Write-in		683	0.09%	+0.04
Total votes		793,260	100.00%	
Republican hold				

== North Carolina ==
2020 North Carolina gubernatorial election
- November 3, 2020
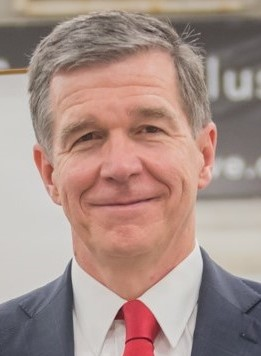

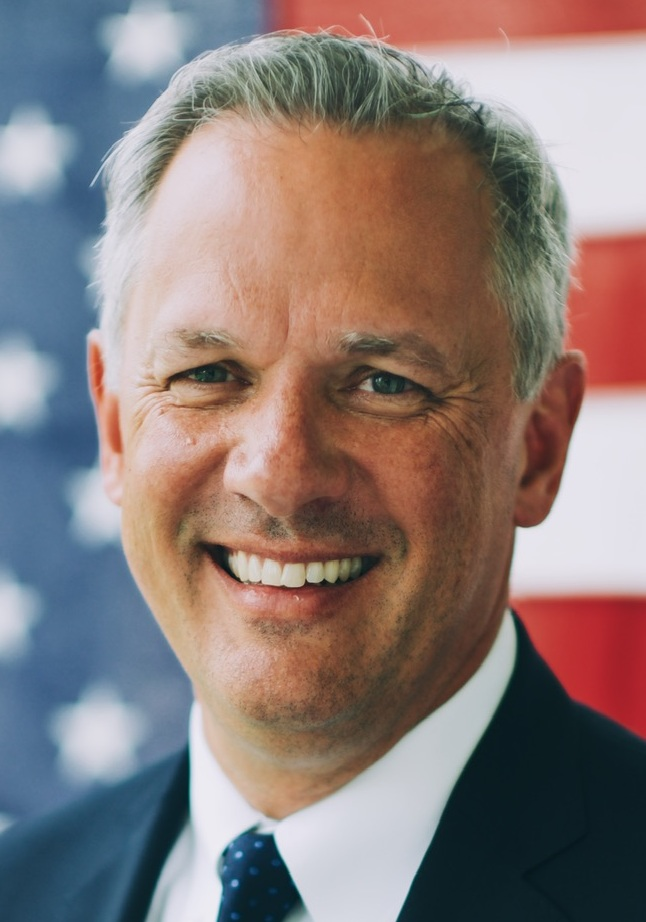
Nominee	Roy Cooper	Dan Forest
Party	Democratic	Republican
Popular vote	2,834,790	2,586,605
Percentage	51.5%	47.0%
- County results Cooper: 40-50% 50-60% 60-70% 70-80% 80–90% Forest: 40-50% 50-60% 60-70% 70-80%
Governor before election
Roy Cooper
Democratic
Elected Governor
Roy Cooper
Democratic

One-term incumbent Democrat Roy Cooper, who won his 2016 election by an extremely slim margin of only 10,281 votes, ran for re-election in 2020. Lieutenant Governor Dan Forest was the Republican nominee. Primaries were held on March 3, where Cooper defeated retired U.S. Army captain and perennial candidate Ernest T. Reeves in a landslide in the Democratic primary, and Forest decisively defeated the North Carolina state representative from the 20th district, Holly Grange, in the Republican primary. Cooper won reelection as pundits predicted, though the margin was close. Cooper outperformed national Democrats in the state, who narrowly lost both the Presidential and Senate races.

North Carolina Democratic primary
Party	Candidate	Votes	%
Democratic	Roy Cooper (incumbent)	1,128,829	87.19
Democratic	Ernest T. Reeves	165,804	12.81
Total votes		1,294,633	100.00

North Carolina Republican primary
Party	Candidate	Votes	%
Republican	Dan Forest	698,077	88.95
Republican	Holly Grange	86,714	11.05
Total votes		784,791	100.00

North Carolina general election
Party	Candidate	Votes	%	±%
Democratic	Roy Cooper (incumbent)	2,834,790	51.52%	+2.50
Republican	Dan Forest	2,586,605	47.01%	–1.79
Libertarian	Steven J. DiFiore	60,449	1.10%	–1.09
Constitution	Al Pisano	20,934	0.38%	N/A
Total votes		5,502,778	100.00%	
Democratic hold				

== North Dakota ==
2020 North Dakota gubernatorial election
- November 3, 2020
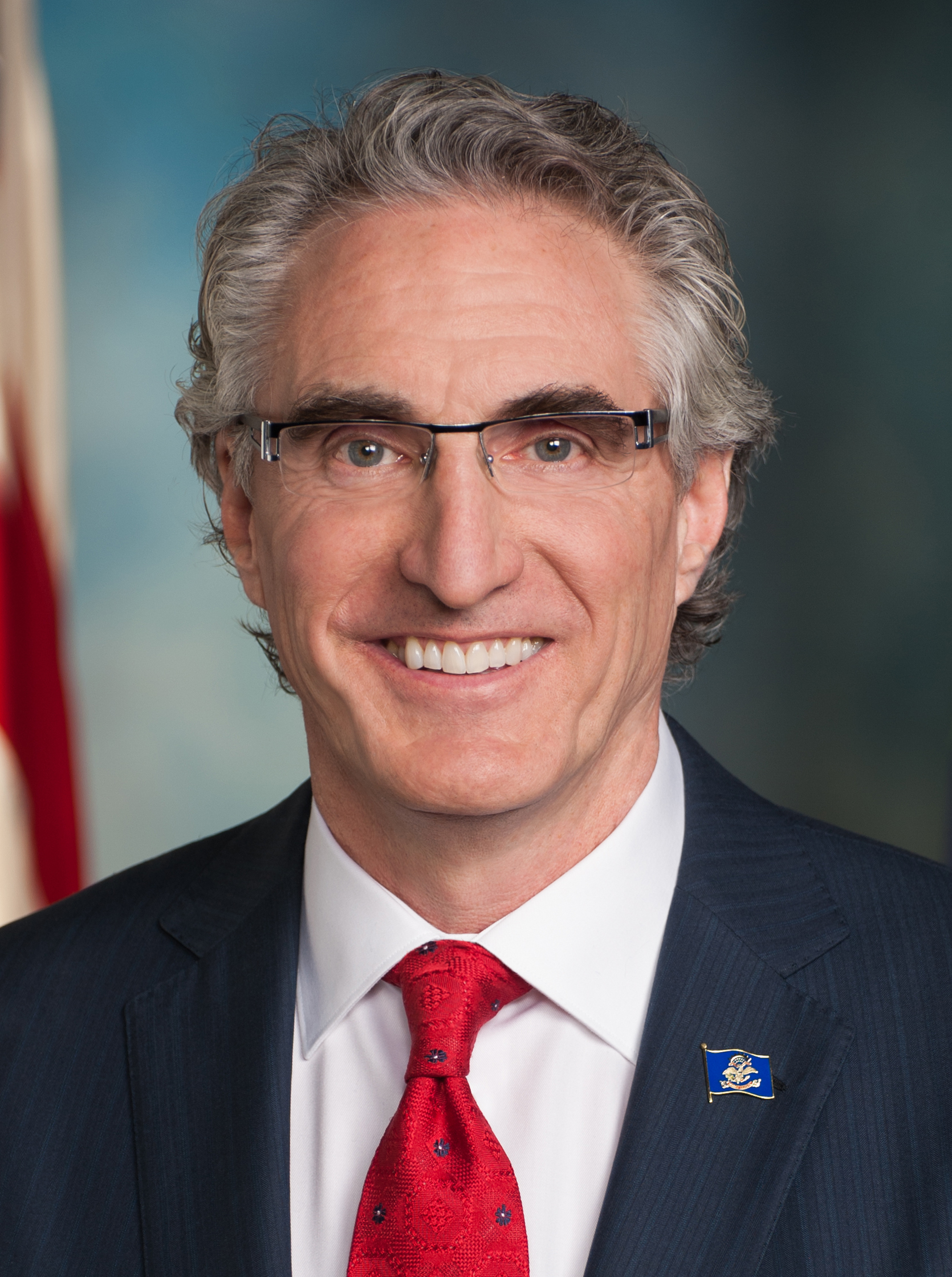

Nominee	Doug Burgum	Shelley Lenz
Party	Republican	Democratic–NPL
Running mate	Brent Sanford	Ben Vig
Popular vote	235,479	90,789
Percentage	65.8%	25.4%
- County results Burgum: 50-60% 60-70% 70-80% 80-90% Lenz: 50-60% 60-70%
Governor before election
Doug Burgum
Republican
Elected Governor
Doug Burgum
Republican

One-term incumbent Republican Doug Burgum ran for re-election in 2020. Brent Sanford, the incumbent lieutenant governor, remained his running mate. The Democratic nominee was veterinarian and former Killdeer school board member Shelly Lenz, whose running mate was Ben Vig, a former member of the North Dakota House of Representatives from the 23rd district. Primaries were held on June 9, with Burgum winning by a landslide margin over U.S. Air Force veteran Michael Coachman and Lenz running uncontested. Burgum won reelection in a landslide.

North Dakota Republican primary
Party	Candidate	Votes	%
Republican	Doug Burgum (incumbent)	93,737	89.60
Republican	Michael Coachman	10,577	10.11
Write-in		300	0.29
Total votes		104,614	100.00

North Dakota Democratic-NPL primary
Party	Candidate	Votes	%
Democratic–NPL	Shelley Lenz	33,386	99.45
Write-in		186	0.55
Total votes		33,572	100.00

North Dakota general election
Party	Candidate	Votes	%	±%
Republican	Doug Burgum (incumbent)	235,479	65.84%	–10.68
Democratic–NPL	Shelley Lenz	90,789	25.38%	+5.99
Libertarian	DuWayne Hendrickson	13,853	3.87%	–0.03
Write-in		17,538	4.90%	+4.71
Total votes		357,659	100.00%	
Republican hold				

== Utah ==
2020 Utah gubernatorial election
- November 3, 2020
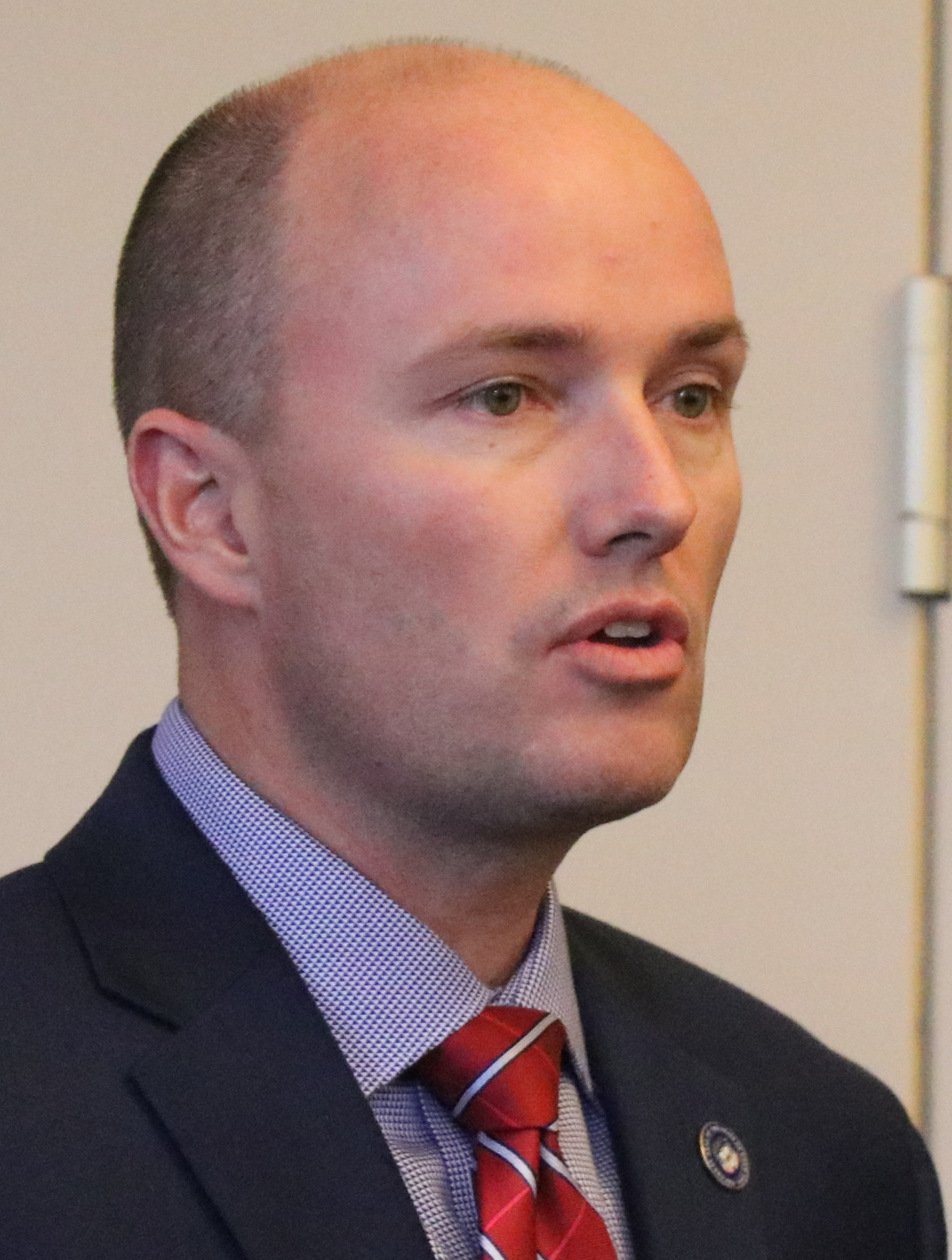

Nominee	Spencer Cox	Christopher Peterson
Party	Republican	Democratic
Running mate	Deidre Henderson	Karina Brown
Popular vote	918,754	442,754
Percentage	63.0%	30.4%
- County results Cox: 50-60% 60-70% 70-80% 80-90% Peterson: 40-50% 50-60%
Governor before election
Gary Herbert
Republican
Elected Governor
Spencer Cox
Republican

Two and a half-term incumbent Republican Gary Herbert was eligible for re-election in 2020, as Utah does not have gubernatorial term limits. However, he announced shortly after being re-elected in 2016 that he would not run for a third full term. Lieutenant Governor Spencer Cox defeated multiple other high-profile Republicans in the competitive Republican primary on June 30 including former governor Jon Huntsman Jr., Speaker of the Utah House of Representatives Greg Hughes, and former chairman of the Utah Republican Party Thomas Wright. Cox's running mate for lieutenant governor was Utah senator from the 7th district, Deidre Henderson. Meanwhile, University of Utah law professor Christopher Peterson won an overwhelming majority of delegates at the Utah Democratic Convention, immediately awarding him with the Democratic nomination alongside his running mate, community organizer Karina Brown. During the general election campaign, an advertisement featuring Cox and Peterson together calling for unity went viral. Cox won in a landslide, outperforming national Republicans in the state.

Utah Republican primary
Party	Candidate	Votes	%
Republican	Spencer Cox	176,012	36.60
Republican	Jon Huntsman Jr.	165,083	34.33
Republican	Greg Hughes	101,500	21.11
Republican	Thomas Wright	38,274	7.96
Total votes		480,869	100.00

Utah general election
Party	Candidate	Votes	%	±%
Republican	Spencer Cox	918,754	62.98%	–3.76
Democratic	Christopher Peterson	442,754	30.35%	+1.61
Libertarian	Daniel Cottam	51,393	3.52%	+0.42
Independent American	Gregory Duerden	25,810	1.77%	+0.36
Write-in		20,167	1.38%	+1.37
Total votes		1,458,878	100.00%	
Republican hold				

== Vermont ==
2020 Vermont gubernatorial election
- November 3, 2020
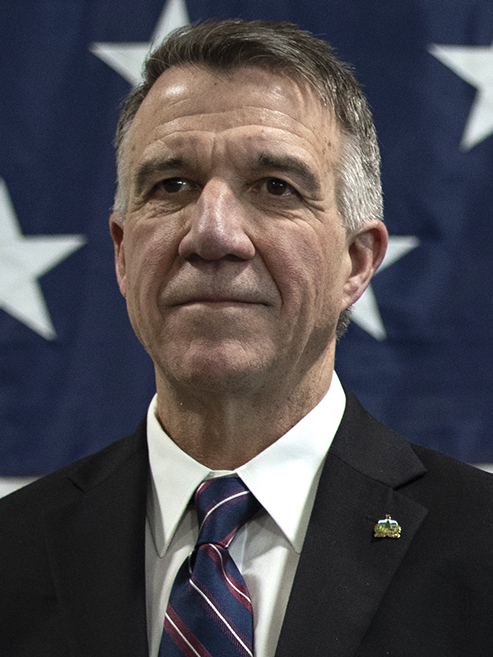

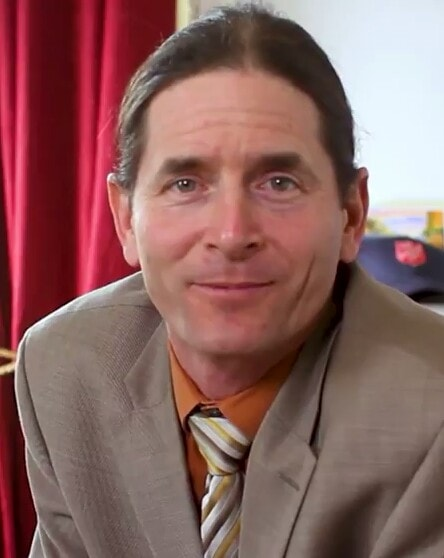
Nominee	Phil Scott	David Zuckerman
Party	Republican	Progressive
Alliance		Democratic
Popular vote	248,412	99,214
Percentage	68.5%	27.4%
- County results Scott: 50–60% 60–70% 70–80%
Governor before election
Phil Scott
Republican
Elected Governor
Phil Scott
Republican

Two-term incumbent Republican Phil Scott confirmed he was seeking a third term in 2020. However, he did not campaign due to the COVID-19 pandemic, the handling of which awarded Scott with a 75% approval rating in the summer. Scott was re-elected with 55% of the vote in 2018. Scott is a heavy critic of President Donald Trump, who holds a net negative 39% disapproval rating in Vermont. He is one of the last remaining liberal Republican politicians with center-left political leanings, and remains an outlier in the otherwise staunchly Democratic state. Primary elections were held on August 11. Scott defeated multiple challengers in the Republican primary, the most prominent of which was lawyer and pastor John Klar. Lieutenant Governor David Zuckerman defeated former education secretary Rebecca Holcombe in the Democratic primary. He also defeated Cris Ericson and Boots Wardinski in the Vermont Progressive Party primary, despite only being recognized as a write-in candidate. Zuckerman was endorsed by U.S. senator from Vermont Bernie Sanders, the most popular senator amongst his constituents in the country. Zuckerman chose to run under the Progressive Party ballot line in the general election, listing the Democratic Party as a secondary nomination, utilizing Vermont's electoral fusion system. Despite Vermont being one of the most heavily Democratic states in the nation with a partisan voting index of D+15, Scott won reelection in a landslide because of his widespread popularity and focus on local issues. Scott has also been praised for his handling of the COVID-19 pandemic. Zuckerman had also made past comments perceived as being anti-vaccination.

Vermont Republican primary
Party	Candidate	Votes	%
Republican	Phil Scott (incumbent)	42,275	72.67
Republican	John Klar	12,762	21.94
Republican	Emily Peyton	970	1.67
Republican	Douglas Cavett	966	1.66
Republican	Bernard Peters	772	1.33
Write-in		426	0.73
Total votes		58,171	100.00

Vermont Democratic primary
Party	Candidate	Votes	%
Democratic	David Zuckerman	48,150	47.56
Democratic	Rebecca Holcombe	37,599	37.14
Democratic	Patrick Winburn	7,662	7.57
Democratic	Ralph Corbo	1,288	1.27
Write-in		6,533	6.45
Total votes		101,232	100.00

Vermont Progressive results
Party	Candidate	Votes	%
Progressive	David Zuckerman (write-in)	273	32.62
Progressive	Cris Ericson	254	30.35
Progressive	Boots Wardinski	239	28.55
Write-in		71	8.48
Total votes		837	100.00

Vermont general election
Party	Candidate	Votes	%	±%
Republican	Phil Scott (incumbent)	248,412	68.49%	+13.30
Progressive	David Zuckerman	99,214	27.35%	–12.90
Independent	Kevin Hoyt	4,576	1.26%	N/A
Independent	Emily Peyton	3,505	0.97%	+0.31
Independent	Erynn Hazlett Whitney	1,777	0.49%	N/A
Independent	Wayne Billado III	1,431	0.39%	N/A
Independent	Michael A. Devost	1,160	0.32%	N/A
Independent	Charly Dickerson	1,037	0.29%	N/A
Write-in		1,599	0.44%	+0.03
Total votes		362,711	100.00%	
Republican hold				

== Washington ==
2020 Washington gubernatorial election
- November 3, 2020
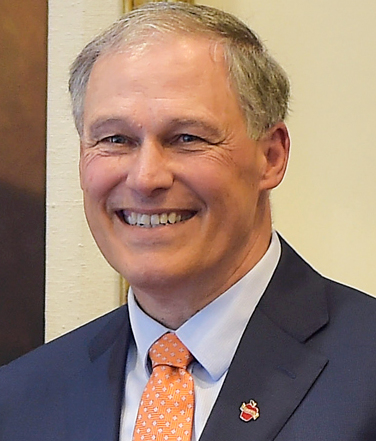

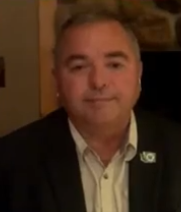
Nominee	Jay Inslee	Loren Culp
Party	Democratic	Republican
Popular vote	2,294,243	1,749,066
Percentage	56.6%	43.1%
- County results Inslee: 40–50% 50-60% 60-70% 70-80% Culp: 50-60% 60-70% 70-80%
Governor before election
Jay Inslee
Democratic
Elected Governor
Jay Inslee
Democratic

Two-term incumbent Democrat Jay Inslee was eligible to run for re-election in 2020, as Washington does not have gubernatorial term limits. Inslee ran for re-election to a third term after dropping out of the Democratic presidential primaries on August 21, 2019. He faced police chief of the city of Republic, Washington, Loren Culp. A top-two, jungle primary took place on August 4, meaning that all candidates appeared on the same ballot regardless of party affiliation and the top two (Inslee and Culp) advanced to the general election in November. Washington is one of two states in the country, alongside California and Louisiana (and Nebraska for statewide offices), that holds jungle primaries rather than conventional ones. Inslee won both the primary and general elections in a landslide, becoming the first governor of Washington in decades to be elected to a third term. Culp refused to concede, citing false claims of election fraud.

Washington blanket primary
Party	Candidate	Votes	%
Democratic	Jay Inslee (incumbent)	1,247,916	50.14
Republican	Loren Culp	433,238	17.41
Republican	Joshua Freed	222,533	8.94
Republican	Tim Eyman	159,495	6.41
Republican	Raul Garcia	135,045	5.43
Republican	Phil Fortunato	99,265	3.99
Democratic	Don L. Rivers	25,601	1.03
Trump Republican	Leon Aaron Lawson	23,073	0.93
Green	Liz Hallock	21,537	0.87
Democratic	Cairo D'Almeida	14,657	0.59
Trump Republican	Anton Sakharov	13,935	0.56
Pre2016 Republican	Nate Herzog	11,303	0.45
Democratic	Gene Hart	10,605	0.43
Democratic	Omari Tahir Garrett	8,751	0.35
Independent	Ryan Ryals	6,264	0.25
Socialist Workers	Henry Clay Dennison	5,970	0.24
Trump Republican	Goodspaceguy	5,646	0.23
Republican	Richard L. Carpenter	4,962	0.20
Independent	Elaina J. Gonzales	4,772	0.19
Republican	Matthew Murray	4,489	0.18
Independent	Thor Amundson	3,638	0.15
Republican	Bill Hirt	2,854	0.11
Republican	Martin L. Wheeler	2,686	0.11
Republican	Ian Gonzales	2,537	0.10
New-Liberty	Joshua Wolf	2,315	0.09
Independent	Cregan M. Newhouse	2,291	0.09
Independent	Brian R. Weed	2,178	0.09
StandupAmerica	Alex Tsimerman	1,721	0.07
Republican	Tylor Grow	1,509	0.06
Independent	Dylan B. Nails	1,470	0.06
Independent	Craig Campbell	1,178	0.05
American Patriot	William Miller	1,148	0.05
Independent	Cameron M. Vessey	718	0.03
Propertarianist	Winston Wilkes	702	0.03
Fifth Republic	David W. Blomstrom	519	0.02
Cascadia Labour	David Voltz	480	0.02
Write-in		1,938	0.08
Total votes		2,488,959	100.00

Washington general election
Party	Candidate	Votes	%	±%
Democratic	Jay Inslee (incumbent)	2,294,243	56.56%	+2.31
Republican	Loren Culp	1,749,066	43.12%	–2.37
Write-in		13,145	0.32%	+0.06
Total votes		4,056,454	100.00%	
Democratic hold				

== West Virginia ==
2020 West Virginia gubernatorial election
- November 3, 2020
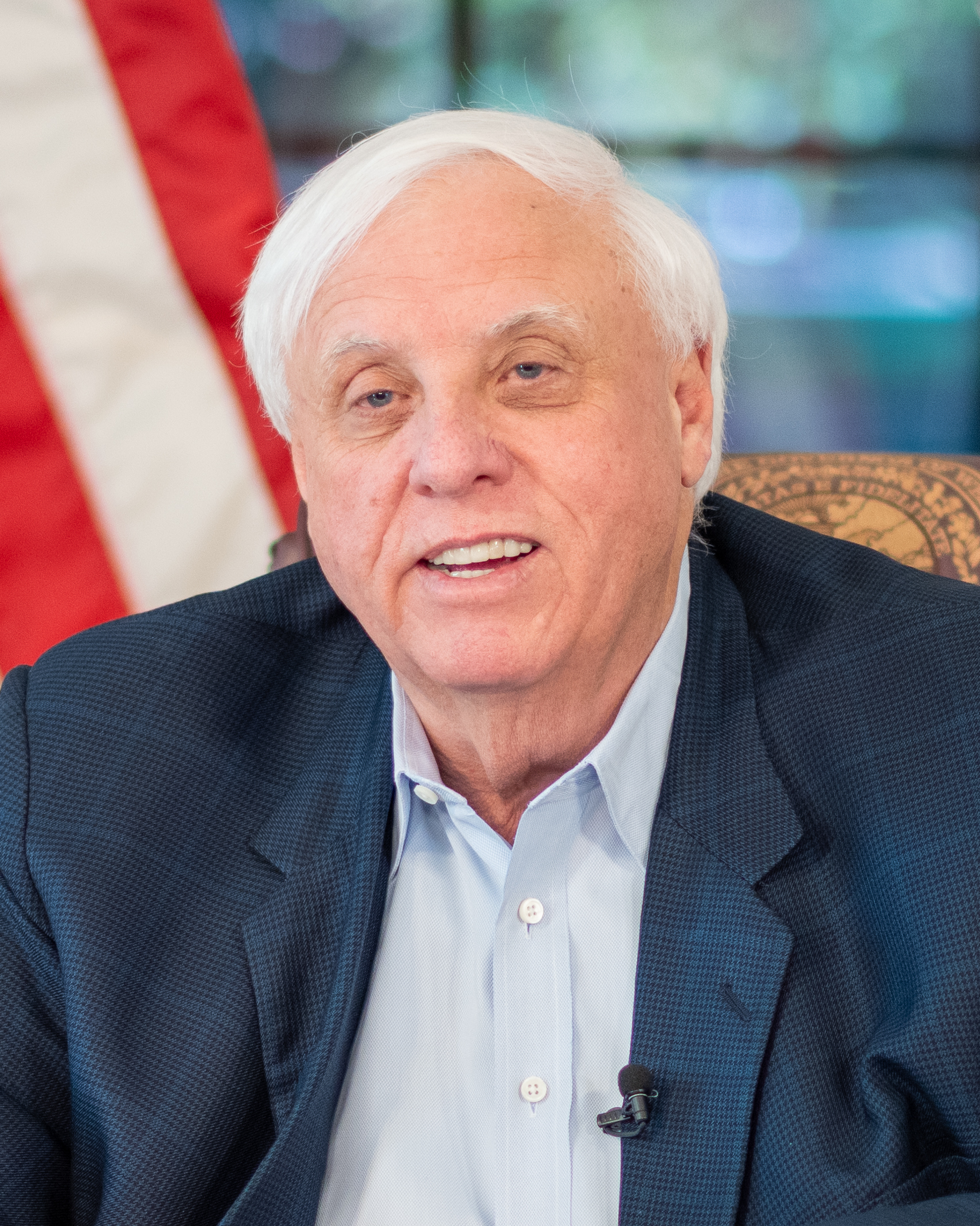

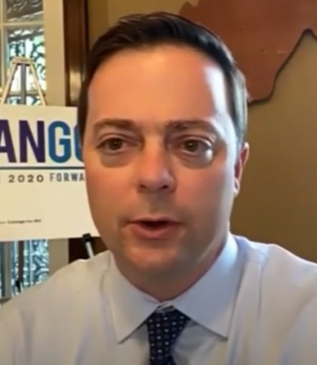
Nominee	Jim Justice	Ben Salango
Party	Republican	Democratic
Popular vote	497,944	237,024
Percentage	63.5%	30.2%
- County results Justice: 40–50% 50–60% 60–70% 70–80% 80–90%
Governor before election
Jim Justice
Republican
Elected Governor
Jim Justice
Republican

One-term incumbent Republican Jim Justice ran for re-election in 2020. Justice was elected as a Democrat, but later switched to the Republican Party, making him the first Republican governor since Cecil H. Underwood, elected from 1997 until 2001. Justice faced centrist Democrat Ben Salango, who was endorsed by U.S. senator Joe Manchin. Primaries were held on June 9, with Justice defeating former West Virginia secretary of commerce Woody Thrasher and former member of the West Virginia House of Delegates from the 63rd district, Mike Folk, by a large margin. Meanwhile, Salango won by a slim margin in a hotly contested Democratic primary between Salango and community organizer Stephen Smith, businessman Jody Murphy, and Douglas Hughes.

Attorney General Patrick Morrisey, retired Olympic gymnast Mary Lou Retton, and Secretary of State Mac Warner were mentioned as potential general election challengers, prior to Justice's decision to re-join the Republican Party.

Justice won reelection in a landslide.

West Virginia Republican primary
Party	Candidate	Votes	%
Republican	Jim Justice (incumbent)	133,586	62.60
Republican	Woody Thrasher	38,891	18.20
Republican	Michael Folk	27,255	12.80
Republican	Doug Six	4,413	2.13
Republican	Brooke Lunsford	3,837	1.82
Republican	Shelly Jean Fitzhugh	2,815	1.29
Republican	Chuck Sheedy	2,539	1.16
Total votes		213,336	100.00

West Virginia Democratic primary results
Party	Candidate	Votes	%
Democratic	Ben Salango	73,099	38.78
Democratic	Stephen Smith	63,281	33.57
Democratic	Ron Stollings	25,322	13.43
Democratic	Jody Murphy	17,692	9.39
Democratic	Douglas Hughes	9,100	4.83
Total votes		188,494	100.00

West Virginia general election
Party	Candidate	Votes	%	±%
Republican	Jim Justice (incumbent)	497,944	63.49%	+21.19
Democratic	Ben Salango	237,024	30.22%	–18.87
Libertarian	Erika Kolenich	22,527	2.87%	+0.72
Write-in	S. Marshall Wilson	15,120	1.93%	N/A
Mountain	Daniel Lutz	11,309	1.44%	–4.45
Write-in		363	0.05%	N/A
Total votes		784,287	100.00%	
Republican hold				

== Territories ==
=== American Samoa ===
2020 American Samoa gubernatorial election
- November 3, 2020
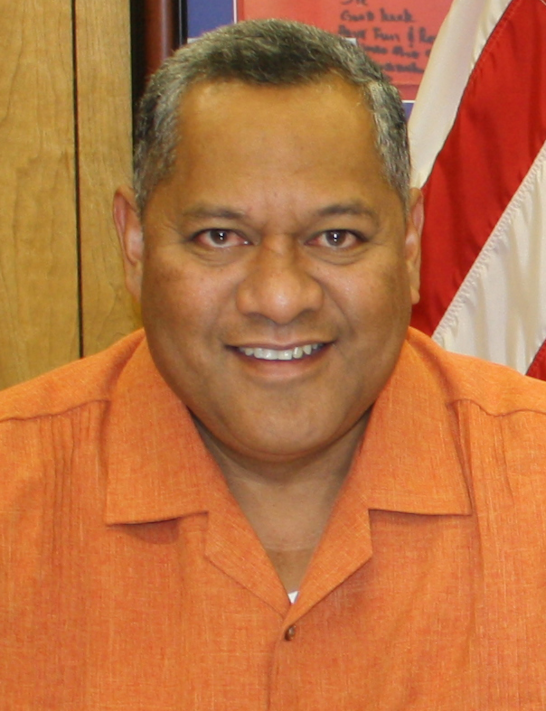
Nominee	Lemanu Peleti Mauga	Gaoteote Palaie Tofau
Party	Nonpartisan	Nonpartisan
Running mate	Eleasalo Ale	Faiivae Iuli Alex Godinet
Popular vote	7,154	2,594
Percentage	60.3%	21.9%
Nominee	Iʻaulualo Faʻafetai Talia	Nuanuaolefeagaiga Saoluaga T. Nua
Party	Nonpartisan	Nonpartisan
Running mate	Tapaʻau Dr. Dan Mageo Aga	Tapumanaia Galu Satele Jr.
Popular vote	1,461	652
Percentage	12.3%	5.5%
- Results by voting district: Lemanu Peleti Mauga: 40–45% 45–50% 50–55% 55–60% 60–65% 65–70% 70–75% Gaoteote Palaie Tofau: 45–50% Iʻaulualo Faʻafetai Talia: 60–65%
Governor before election
Lolo Matalasi Moliga
Nonpartisan
Elected Governor
Lemanu Peleti Mauga
Nonpartisan

Two-term incumbent governor Lolo Letalu Matalasi Moliga was term-limited in 2020. Running to replace him were Lieutenant Governor Lemanu Palepoi Sialega Mauga, American Samoa Senate President Gaoteote Palaie Tofau, territorial Senator Nua Sao, and executive director of the American Samoa Government Employees' Retirement Fund Iʻaulualo Faʻafetai Talia. Although individuals can and do affiliate with political parties, elections are held on a non-partisan basis with candidates running without party labels and no party primaries. The governor and lieutenant governor are elected on a shared ticket. The Mauga–Ale ticket won the election with more than 60% of the vote.

American Samoa general election
Party	Candidate	Votes	%
Nonpartisan	Lemanu Peleti Mauga	7,154	60.31
Nonpartisan	Gaoteote Palaie Tofau	2,594	21.87
Nonpartisan	Iʻaulualo Faʻafetai Talia	1,461	12.32
Nonpartisan	Nuanuaolefeagaiga Saoluaga T. Nua	652	5.50
Total votes		11,861	100.00
Democratic hold			

=== Puerto Rico ===
2020 Puerto Rico gubernatorial election
- November 3, 2020
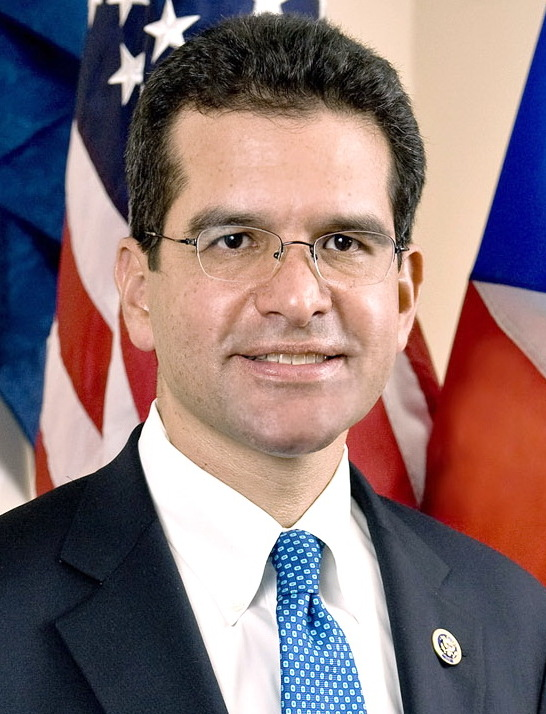

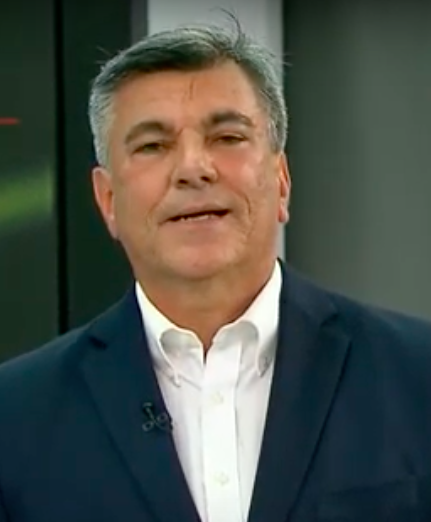

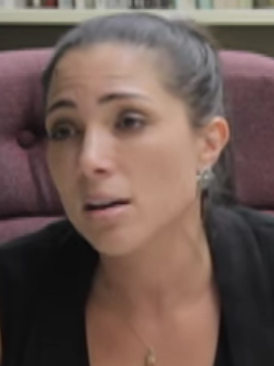

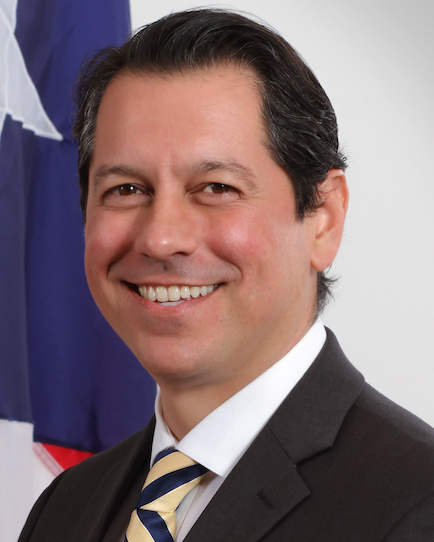

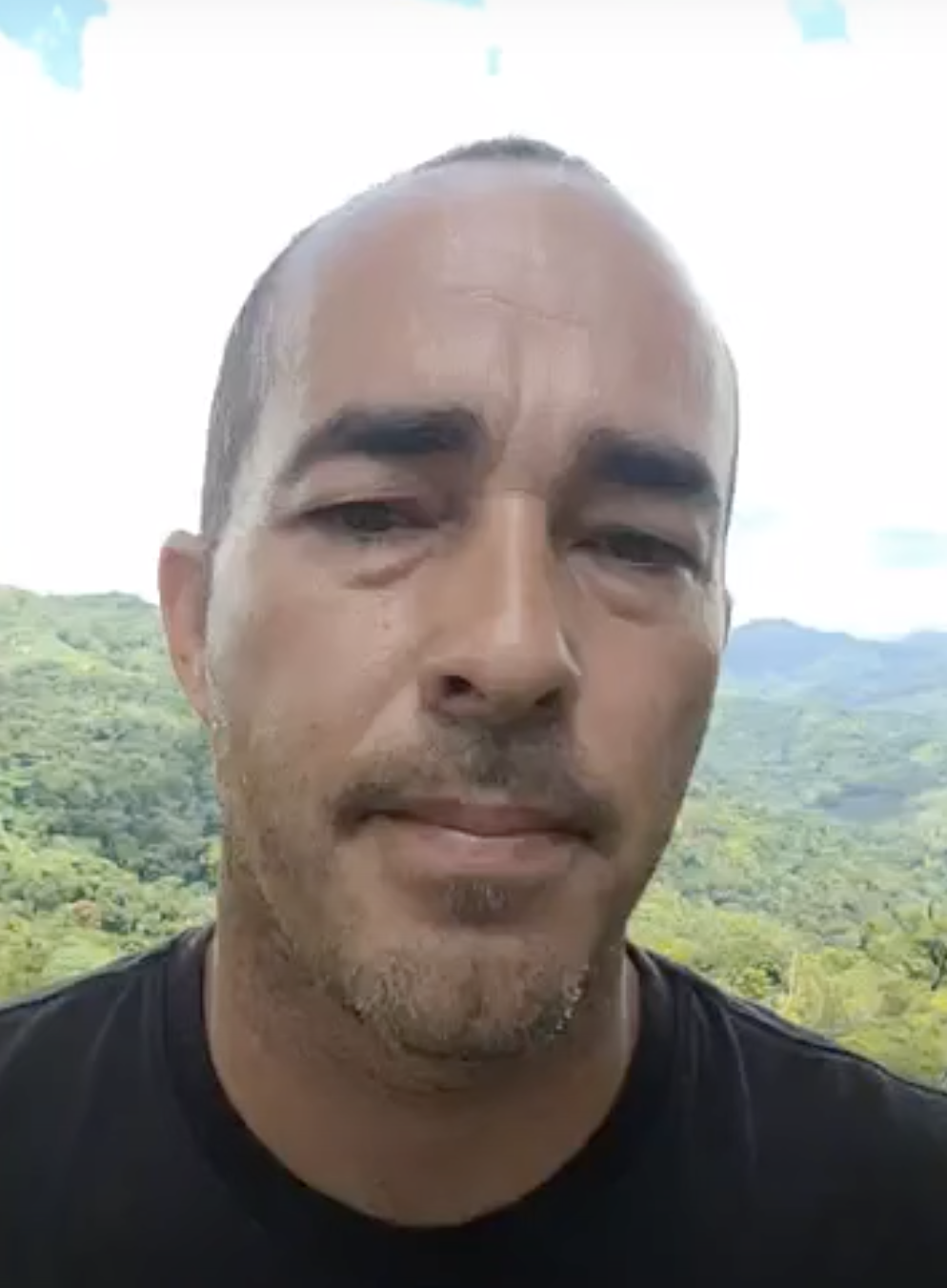
Nominee	Pedro Pierluisi	Carlos Delgado Altieri	Alexandra Lúgaro
Party	New Progressive	Popular Democratic	Citizens' Victory
Alliance	Democratic	Independent
Popular vote	406,830	389,896	175,583
Percentage	32.9%	31.6%	14.2%
Nominee	Juan Dalmau	César Vázquez Muñiz	Eliezer Molina
Party	Puerto Rican Independence Party	Project Dignity	Independent
Popular vote	169,516	85,211	8,485
Percentage	13.7%	6.9%	0.6%
- Results by municipality
Governor before election
Wanda Vázquez
New Progressive Party
Elected Governor
Pedro Pierluisi
New Progressive Party

Incumbent governor Wanda Vázquez Garced of the New Progressive Party and the Republican Party, who became governor after Pedro Pierluisi's succession of Ricardo Rosselló was declared unconstitutional, was defeated in the New Progressive primary by Pierluisi in her bid to win a full term. He faced Isabela mayor Carlos Delgado Altieri, who won the Popular Democratic Party primary, as well as Senator Juan Dalmau of the Puerto Rican Independence Party, Alexandra Lúgaro of Movimiento Victoria Ciudadana, César Vázquez of Proyecto Dignidad, and independent candidate Eliezer Molina. Pierluisi won the election by a very slim margin.

New Progressive primary
Party	Candidate	Votes	%
New Progressive	Pedro Pierluisi	162,345	57.67
New Progressive	Wanda Vázquez Garced (incumbent)	119,184	42.33
Total votes		281,529	100.00

Popular Democratic primary
Party	Candidate	Votes	%
Popular Democratic	Carlos Delgado Altieri	128,638	62.97
Popular Democratic	Eduardo Bhatia	48,563	23.77
Popular Democratic	Carmen Yulín Cruz	27,068	13.25
Total votes		204,269	100.00

Puerto Rico general election
Party	Candidate	Votes	%	±%
New Progressive	Pedro Pierluisi	406,830	32.93%	–8.87
Popular Democratic	Carlos Delgado Altieri	389,896	31.56%	–7.31
Citizens' Victory	Alexandra Lúgaro	175,583	14.21%	+3.08
Independence	Juan Dalmau	169,516	13.72%	+11.59
Project Dignity	César Vázquez	85,211	6.90%	N/A
Independent	Eliezer Molina	8,485	0.68%	N/A
Write-in		2,513	0.20%	N/A
Total votes		1,238,034	100.00%	
New Progressive hold				

== See also ==
- 2020 United States presidential election
- 2020 United States House of Representatives elections
- 2020 United States Senate elections
