= Tammy Miller (politician) =

American politician (born 1960)

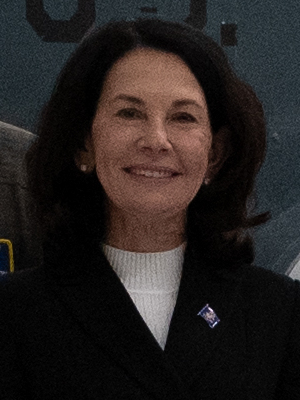

39th Lieutenant Governor of North Dakota
- In office January 3, 2023 – December 15, 2024
- Governor: Doug Burgum
- Preceded by: Brent Sanford
- Succeeded by: Michelle Strinden

Personal details
- Born: February 8, 1960 (age 66) Brocket, North Dakota, U.S.
- Party: Republican
- Spouse: Craig Palmer
- Education: Minnesota State University, Moorhead (BS, MBA)
- Website: Campaign website

Tammy Miller (born February 8, 1960) is an American politician and corporate executive from North Dakota. A member of the Republican Party, she served as the 39th lieutenant governor of North Dakota from 2023 to 2024. Miller was appointed by Governor Doug Burgum, following Lieutenant Governor Brent Sanford's resignation.

Miller was a candidate in the 2024 North Dakota gubernatorial election.

== Early life and career ==
Miller was born on February 8, 1960, and was raised in Brocket, North Dakota. She is the daughter of Ralph and Gen Miller. Growing up, Tammy worked in her family's lumber and hardware store, Miller's Shopping Center on the Prairie, cleaning toilets and stocking shelves. On multiple occasions, she had to use a shotgun to defend the store against thieves.

Miller attended high school in Lakota, North Dakota. She earned a bachelor's degree in accounting and a Master of Business Administration degree from Minnesota State University Moorhead. She is a certified public accountant. Miller started her career in public accounting with Charles Bailly and Company (now Eide Bailly).

In 1991, Miller joined employee-owned Border States as the accounting manager. She served in a variety of roles including corporate controller, vice president of finance, executive vice president, general manager for the southwest region and president. She was named chief executive officer and board chair in 2006. Under Miller's leadership, Border States grew from under $500 million in annual sales to nearly $2.5 billion and became the sixth-largest electrical distributor in North America.

In 2025, Miller joined the board for MDU Resources, one of the regions largest energy and utilities provider.

== Political career ==
Miller considered running in the 2018 U.S. Senate election against Heidi Heitkamp, but opted not to run. She joined the office of the governor of North Dakota in April 2020 as chief operating officer.

=== Lieutenant governor ===
On December 20, 2022, former lieutenant governor Brent Sanford announced his resignation as lieutenant governor of North Dakota, effective January 2, 2023. Governor Doug Burgum appointed Miller to succeed Sanford. Miller is North Dakota's third female lieutenant governor.

Because Burgum was running for president during most of 2023, Miller was responsible for more state government operations than previous lieutenant governors. Miller ceremonially pardoned the turkey for the 2023 Thanksgiving day, along with visiting the Grand Forks Air Force Base in October.

On January 22, 2024, Miller endorsed former president Donald Trump for his re-election bid in 2024.

=== 2024 gubernatorial campaign ===
On January 22, 2024, Burgum announced he would not seek reelection to a third term. On February 15, 2024, Miller announced she would seek the governor's office. She faced U.S. representative Kelly Armstrong in the primary. From the beginning, Miller emphasized her business experience, conservative philosophy and position as a political outsider.

Miller did not attend the North Dakota Republican Party's endorsement convention in April. She instead decided to compete in the primary election. Since her campaign began, Miller has attended numerous campaign events and hosted several town halls to meet with and hear from North Dakota voters.

On February 21, Burgum endorsed Miller to succeed him as governor. The Miller campaign released an ad touting Burgum's endorsement. The ad featured Burgum praising Miller's successes as lieutenant governor and comparing her business experience and outsider status to President Donald Trump's. On April 4, Miller announced her running-mate to be Josh Tiegen, the state commerce commissioner for Burgum.

On April 23, Miller faced Armstrong in a debate hosted by Prairie Public Broadcasting, in which she called him a career politician in rebuttal to his claim that she did not have the relationships to efficiently lead.

On May 15, Miller received criticism and negative reporting after releasing an attack ad discussing how Armstrong, as an attorney, defended a child rapist in 2007.

During the June 11 primary, Miller lost the primary to Armstrong, receiving only 27% of the vote. Miller conceded the race that night.

== Political positions ==
=== Abortion ===
Miller supports pro-life legislation. In an interview with WZFG, she said she supported "very narrow" exceptions for young girls who are victims of rape and incest. She supports IVF treatments.

=== Gun rights ===
Miller is a supporter of the 2nd amendment.

=== Immigration ===
Miller is a staunch critic of President Biden's immigration policy. She said if elected governor, she would make sure North Dakota does not provide any benefits to illegal immigrants.

=== Taxes ===
Miller is opposed to removing property taxes in the state of North Dakota, stating that people need to come together and discuss this issue thoroughly. However, Miller does support a full elimination of the state level income tax.

=== Energy ===
Miller has said that the Biden administration's “burdensome regulations” are hurting North Dakota's oil, energy, agriculture industries.

=== Transgender issues ===
Miller supports legislation that would prevent trans women from competing in women's sports. She also supports banning gender-affirming care for minors.

== Personal life ==
Miller's husband, Craig Palmer, was the president of Multiband.

Political offices
Preceded by Brent Sanford	Lieutenant Governor of North Dakota; 2023–2024	Succeeded by Michelle Strinden
