= Brocket, North Dakota =

- City
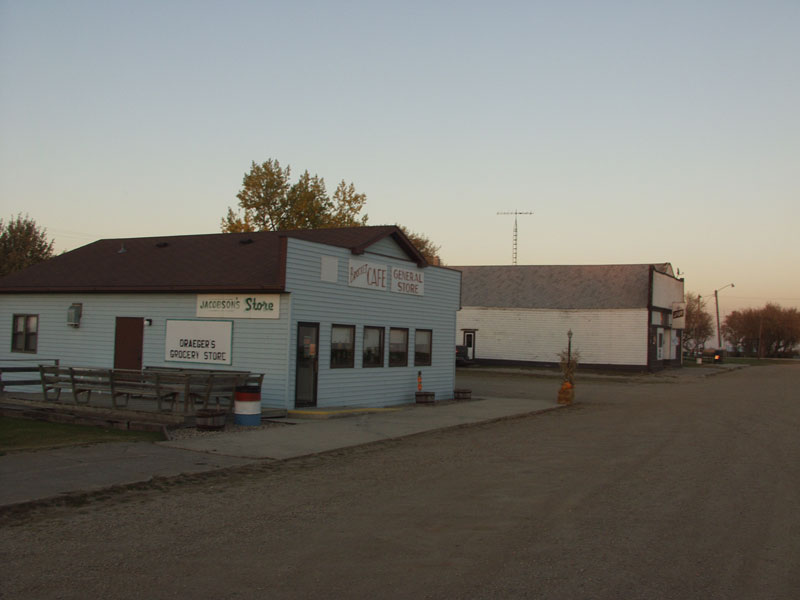
- Brocket at twilight
- Interactive map of Brocket, North Dakota
- Location within North Dakota Location within the United States
- Coordinates: 48.2108°N 98.3554°W
- Country: United States
- State: North Dakota
- County: Ramsey
- Founded: 1901

Area
  - Total: 0.759 sq mi (1.966 km^{2})
  - Land: 0.756 sq mi (1.957 km^{2})
  - Water: 0.0031 sq mi (0.008 km^{2}) 0.40%
- Elevation: 1,512 ft (461 m)

Population (2020)
  - Total: 34
  - Estimate (2025): 34
  - Density: 45/sq mi (17/km^{2})
- Time zone: UTC–6 (Central (CST))
  - Summer (DST): UTC–5 (CDT)
- ZIP Code: 58321
- Area code: 701
- FIPS code: 38-09700
- GNIS feature ID: 1035943

Brocket is a city in Ramsey County, North Dakota, United States. The population was 34 as of the 2020 census, and was estimated at 34 in 2025.

== History ==
Brocket was founded in 1901.

== Geography ==
According to the United States Census Bureau, the city has a total area of 0.759 square miles (1.97 km^{2}), of which 0.756 square miles (1.96 km^{2}) is land and 0.003 square miles (0.0078 km^{2}) (0.40%) is water.

== Demographics ==
Historical population
Census	Pop.	Note	%±
1910	186		—
1920	240		29.0%
1930	276		15.0%
1940	291		5.4%
1950	212		−27.1%
1960	153		−27.8%
1970	95		−37.9%
1980	74		−22.1%
1990	81		9.5%
2000	65		−19.8%
2010	57		−12.3%
2020	34		−40.4%
2025 (est.)	34		0.0%
U.S. Decennial Census; 2020 Census

=== 2020 census ===
As of the 2020 census, there were 34 people, 18 households, and 14 families residing in the city. The population density was 44.97 inhabitants per square mile (17.4/km^{2}). There were 30 housing units at an average density of 39.68 per square mile (15.3/km^{2}). The racial makeup of the city was 94.12% White, 0.00% African American, 0.00% Native American, 5.88% Asian, 0.00% Pacific Islander, 0.00% from some other races and 0.00% from two or more races. Hispanic or Latino people of any race were 0.00% of the population.

In 2026, The median household income in Brocket is $103,750 with a poverty rate of 0%. The median age in Brocket is 53.9 years: 53.7 years for males, and 65.5 years for females. For every 100 females there are 330.0 males.

=== 2010 census ===
As of the 2010 census, there were 57 people, 25 households, and 17 families residing in the city. The population density was 73.1 inhabitants per square mile (28.2/km^{2}). There were 38 housing units at an average density of 48.7 per square mile (18.8/km^{2}). The racial makeup of the city was 100.0% White.

There were 25 households, of which 24.0% had children under the age of 18 living with them, 60.0% were married couples living together, 4.0% had a female householder with no husband present, 4.0% had a male householder with no wife present, and 32.0% were non-families. 28.0% of all households were made up of individuals, and 20% had someone living alone who was 65 years of age or older. The average household size was 2.28 and the average family size was 2.82.

The median age in the city was 50.5 years. 21.1% of residents were under the age of 18; 5.3% were between the ages of 18 and 24; 14.1% were from 25 to 44; 33.4% were from 45 to 64; and 26.3% were 65 years of age or older. The gender makeup of the city was 57.9% male and 42.1% female.

=== 2000 census ===
As of the 2000 census, there were 65 people, 26 households, and 15 families residing in the city. The population density was 83 people per square mile (32.2/km^{2}). There were 35 housing units at an average density of 44.6 per square mile (17.2/km^{2}). The racial makeup of the city was 92.31% White, 1.54% Asian, and 6.15% from two or more races.

There were 26 households, out of which 30.8% had children under the age of 18 living with them, 50.0% were married couples living together, 7.7% had a female householder with no husband present, and 42.3% were non-families. 38.5% of all households were made up of individuals, and 15.4% had someone living alone who was 65 years of age or older. The average household size was 2.50 and the average family size was 3.27.

In the city, the population was spread out, with 33.8% under the age of 18, 1.5% from 18 to 24, 27.7% from 25 to 44, 15.4% from 45 to 64, and 21.5% who were 65 years of age or older. The median age was 36 years. For every 100 females, there were 116.7 males. For every 100 females age 18 and over, there were 126.3 males.

The median income for a household in the city was $19,583, and the median income for a family was $33,750. Males had a median income of $20,625 versus $26,250 for females. The per capita income for the city was $10,548. There were no families and 10.0% of the population living below the poverty line, including no under eighteens and none of those over 64.

== Notable people ==
- Tammy Miller, 39th Lieutenant Governor of North Dakota
