= Ben Vig =

American politician

Member of the North Dakota House of Representatives from the 23rd district
- In office January 2007 – January 2011
- Preceded by: Bill Devlin
- Succeeded by: Bill Devlin

Personal details
- Party: Democratic
- Education: Bismarck State College; Valley City State University (BA)

Benjamin A. Vig is an American politician from North Dakota. He is a former member of the North Dakota House of Representatives and the Democratic Party nominee for lieutenant governor in the 2020 election.

Vig graduated from Valley City State University in 2005. He defeated Bill Devlin in the 2006 elections to represent District 23 in the North Dakota House of Representatives. He lost his reelection bid to Devlin in 2010. Vig considered running for North Dakota's at-large congressional district seat in the United States House of Representatives in the 2012 election, but opted against it. He ran for the North Dakota House in District 23 again in 2014, but lost.

In the 2020 elections, Shelley Lenz, the Democratic nominee for governor of North Dakota, selected Vig as her running mate. Lenz and Vig lost to Doug Burgum and Brent Sanford, who were reelected to their second terms as governor and lieutenant governor, respectively.

Party political offices
Preceded by Joan Heckaman	Democratic nominee for Lieutenant Governor of North Dakota; 2020	Succeeded by Patrick Hart
