= Bill Devlin =

American politician

Member of the North Dakota House of Representatives from the 23rd district
- Incumbent
- Assumed office 2011
- Preceded by: Ben Vig
- In office 1997–2005
- Succeeded by: Ben Vig

Speaker of the North Dakota House of Representatives
- In office 2013–2015
- Preceded by: David Drovdal
- Succeeded by: Wesley Belter

Personal details
- Born: c. 1947 (age 78–79)
- Party: Republican
- Spouse: Margie
- Profession: Newspaper publisher

William R. Devlin (born c. 1947) is an American politician in the state of North Dakota. He is a member of the North Dakota House of Representatives, representing the 23rd district. A Republican, he was first elected in 2010 and also served from 1997 to 2005. He is an alumnus of Mayville State College and former newspaper publisher. Devlin is a former president of the North Dakota Newspaper Association. During his first stint in the House of Representatives, he was the Majority Party Caucus Leader for one year in 1999. He was named Speaker of the North Dakota House of Representatives in 2013. On September 10, 2013, he met with Jack J. C. Yang of the Taipei Economic and Cultural Office in Kansas City.
