= 2020 North Dakota gubernatorial election =

- November 3, 2020
- Turnout: 62.65%
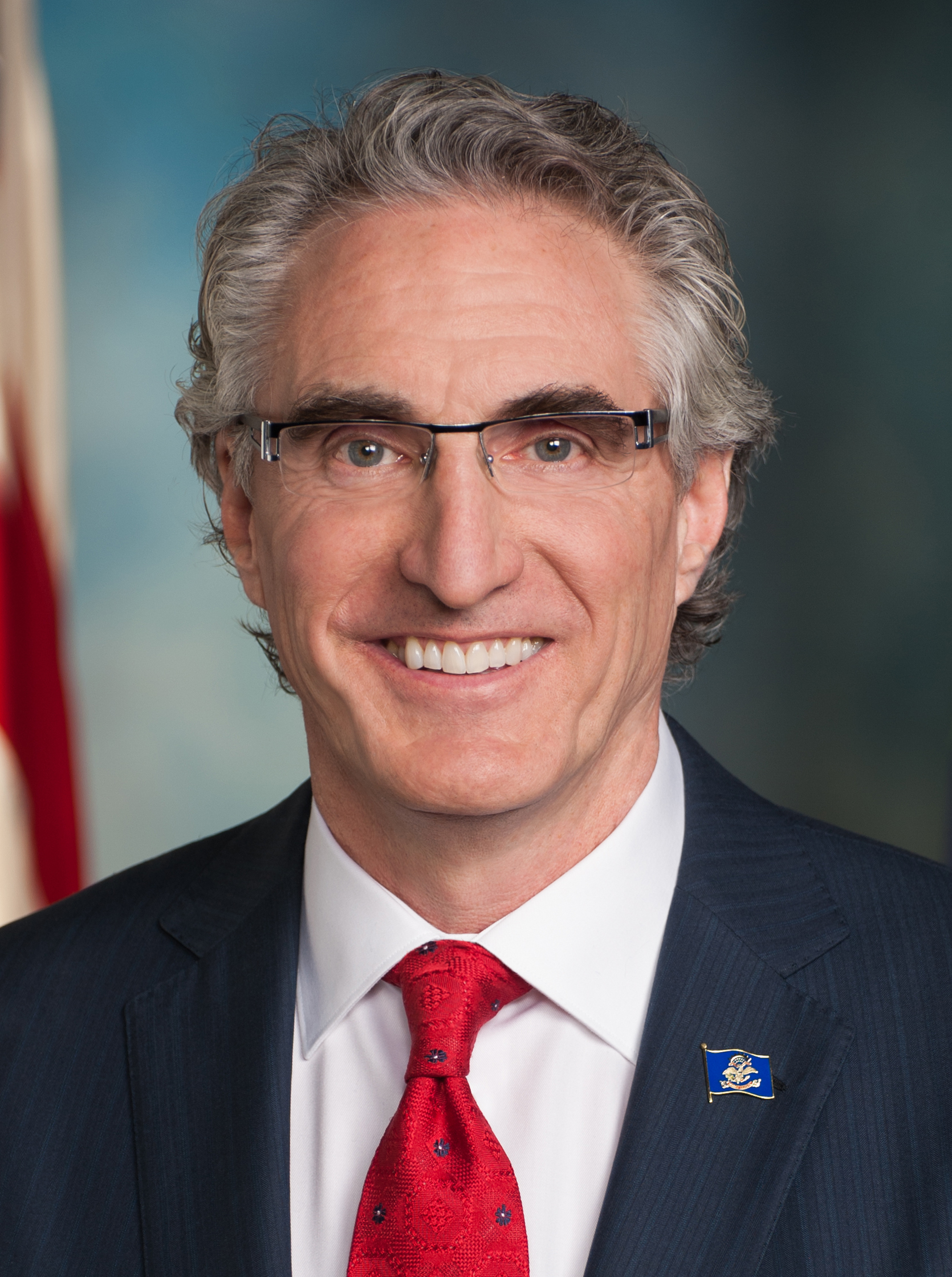

Nominee	Doug Burgum	Shelley Lenz
Party	Republican	Democratic–NPL
Running mate	Brent Sanford	Ben Vig
Popular vote	235,479	90,789
Percentage	65.84%	25.38%
- Burgum: 40–50% 50–60% 60–70% 70–80% 80–90% >90% Lenz: 40–50% 50–60% 60–70% 70–80% 80–90%
Governor before election
Doug Burgum
Republican
Elected Governor
Doug Burgum
Republican

The 2020 North Dakota gubernatorial election was held on November 3, 2020, to elect the governor and lieutenant governor of North Dakota, concurrently with other statewide elections and federal elections, including the U.S. presidential election. Incumbent Republican Governor Doug Burgum and Lieutenant Governor Brent Sanford were both re-elected to a second term.

== Republican primary ==
The Republican Party held a state convention in the spring to endorse a single gubernatorial candidate. That candidate and his or her running mate were automatically placed on the primary election ballot. Endorsed candidates may or may not face competition from other candidates placed there by petition—as incumbent governor Burgum did in 2016. The winner of the primary appears on the general election ballot. All primary elections in North Dakota are open to all qualified North Dakota electors, regardless of party affiliation. The 2020 primary election was held on June 9.

=== Candidates ===
==== Nominee ====
- Doug Burgum, incumbent governor
  - Running mate: Brent Sanford, incumbent lieutenant governor

==== Eliminated in primary ====
- Michael Coachman, former Larimore city councilor and perennial candidate
  - Running mate: Joel H. Hylden

==== Declined ====
- Wayne Stenehjem, North Dakota Attorney General
- Drew Wrigley, U.S. Attorney for the District of North Dakota

=== Results ===
Results by county: Burgum—>90% Burgum—80–90% Burgum—70–80%

Republican primary results
Party	Candidate	Votes	%
Republican	Doug Burgum (incumbent)	96,119	89.51%
Republican	Michael Coachman	10,904	10.15%
Republican	Write-In	356	0.33%
Total votes		107,379	100.0%

== Democratic-NPL primary ==
At the Democratic-NPL Party's virtual state convention on March 21, the party endorsed Shelley Lenz for governor and Ben Vig for lieutenant governor. As a result, they were automatically placed on the primary election ballot, where they did not face competition from other candidates. The primary election was held on June 9, entirely by mail and open to all qualified North Dakota electors, regardless of party affiliation.

=== Candidates ===
==== Nominee ====
- Shelley Lenz, veterinarian and former Killdeer school board member
  - Running mate: Ben Vig, former state representative

==== Declined ====
- Joshua Boschee, minority leader of the North Dakota House of Representatives
- Heidi Heitkamp, former U.S. senator
- Erin Oban, state senator
- Mac Schneider, former minority leader of the North Dakota Senate

=== Results ===
North Dakota Democratic–Nonpartisan League Party primary results
Party	Candidate	Votes	%
Democratic–NPL	Shelley Lenz	34,501	99.33%
Democratic–NPL	Write-In	231	0.67%
Total votes		34,732	100.0%

== Other candidates ==
=== Libertarian Party ===
==== Nominee ====
- DuWayne Hendrickson
  - Running mate: Joshua Voytek

==== Results ====
Libertarian primary results
Party	Candidate	Votes	%
Libertarian	DuWayne Hendrickson	705	77.64%
Libertarian	Write-In	203	22.36%
Total votes		908	100.0%

== General election ==
=== Predictions ===
Source	Ranking	As of
The Cook Political Report	Safe R	October 23, 2020
Inside Elections	Safe R	October 28, 2020
Sabato's Crystal Ball	Safe R	November 2, 2020
Politico	Safe R	November 2, 2020
Daily Kos	Safe R	October 28, 2020
RCP	Safe R	November 2, 2020
270towin	Safe R	November 2, 2020

=== Polling ===
Poll source	Date(s) administered	Sample size (Note: Key: A – all adults RV – registered voters LV – likely voters V – unclear)	Margin of error	Doug Burgum (R)	Shelley Lenz (D)	DuWayne Hendrickson (L)	Undecided
DFM Research	September 12–16, 2020	500 (LV)	± 4.5%	56%	24%	6%	14%

Hypothetical polling

with Heidi Heitkamp

Poll source	Date(s) administered	Sample size	Margin of error	Doug Burgum (R)	Heidi Heitkamp (D)	Other / Undecided
1892 Polling (R) (Note: Poll sponsored by Doug Burgum)	July 15–17, 2019	500 (LV)	± 4.4%	62%	33%	5%

=== Debate ===
The two major party candidates, as well as the Libertarian candidate DuWayne Hendrickson, had a televised debate on October 21.

=== Results ===
North Dakota gubernatorial election, 2020
Party	Candidate	Votes	%	±%
Republican	Doug Burgum (incumbent); Brent Sanford (incumbent)	235,479	65.84	▼10.68
Democratic–NPL	Shelley Lenz; Ben Vig	90,789	25.38	▲5.99
Libertarian	DuWayne Hendrickson; Joshua Voytek	13,853	3.87	▼0.03
Write-in		17,538	4.90%	▲4.71
Total votes		357,659	100.00	
Turnout		364,251	62.65	
Registered electors		581,379		
Republican hold				

==== By county ====
County	Doug Burgum Republican		Shelley Lenz Democratic–NPL		DuWayne Hendrickson Libertarian		Write-in		Margin		Total votes
County	#	%	#	%	#	%	#	%	#	%	Total votes
Adams	1,000	79.37	163	12.94	40	3.17	40	3.17	837	66.43	1,260
Barnes	3,775	68.44	1,366	24.76	173	3.14	202	3.66	2,409	43.67	5,516
Benson	1,098	56.25	708	36.27	61	3.13	85	4.35	390	19.98	1,952
Billings	442	70.27	57	9.06	28	4.45	102	16.22	340	54.05	629
Bottineau	2,653	77.01	588	17.07	93	2.70	111	3.22	2,065	59.94	3,445
Bowman	1,254	76.65	171	10.45	53	3.24	158	9.66	1,083	66.20	1,636
Burke	860	75.31	129	11.30	43	3.77	110	9.63	731	64.01	1,142
Burleigh	31,067	62.13	12,064	24.13	2,385	4.77	4,487	8.97	19,003	38.00	50,003
Cass	50,649	59.31	31,055	36.37	2,737	3.21	951	1.11	19,594	22.95	85,392
Cavalier	1,551	77.13	343	17.06	55	2.73	62	3.08	1,208	60.07	2,011
Dickey	1,791	73.95	479	19.78	72	2.97	80	3.30	1,312	54.17	2,422
Divide	918	76.76	200	16.72	40	3.34	38	3.18	718	60.03	1,196
Dunn	1,711	74.07	280	12.12	99	4.29	220	9.52	1,431	61.95	2,310
Eddy	847	67.60	307	24.50	37	2.95	62	4.95	540	43.10	1,253
Emmons	1,375	70.30	225	11.50	98	5.01	258	13.19	1,117	57.11	1,956
Foster	1,317	74.96	290	16.51	58	3.30	92	5.24	1,027	58.45	1,757
Golden Valley	792	78.11	105	10.36	46	4.54	71	7.00	687	67.75	1,014
Grand Forks	19,150	62.77	10,006	32.80	955	3.13	395	1.29	9,144	29.97	30,506
Grant	964	70.26	171	12.46	71	5.17	166	12.10	793	57.80	1,372
Griggs	924	74.46	247	19.90	33	2.66	37	2.98	677	54.55	1,241
Hettinger	923	71.66	153	11.88	65	5.05	147	11.41	770	59.78	1,288
Kidder	928	64.36	215	14.91	75	5.20	224	15.53	704	48.82	1,442
LaMoure	1,666	75.49	391	17.72	69	3.13	81	3.67	1,275	57.77	2,207
Logan	739	69.78	109	10.29	54	5.10	157	14.83	582	54.96	1,059
McHenry	2,211	74.32	447	15.03	136	4.57	181	6.08	1,764	59.29	2,975
McIntosh	1,109	77.12	201	13.98	64	4.45	64	4.45	908	63.14	1,438
McKenzie	4,305	80.60	659	12.34	192	3.59	185	3.46	3,646	68.26	5,341
McLean	3,466	63.67	1,094	20.10	305	5.60	579	10.64	2,372	43.57	5,444
Mercer	3,352	72.65	591	12.81	175	3.79	496	10.75	2,761	59.84	4,614
Morton	10,254	62.73	3,341	20.44	865	5.29	1,886	11.54	6,913	42.29	16,346
Mountrail	2,691	65.27	1,072	26.00	170	4.12	190	4.61	1,619	39.27	4,123
Nelson	1,192	67.08	504	28.36	40	2.25	41	2.31	688	38.72	1,777
Oliver	741	70.84	123	11.76	44	4.21	138	13.19	603	57.65	1,046
Pembina	2,451	74.27	625	18.94	91	2.76	133	4.03	1,826	55.33	3,300
Pierce	1,522	72.20	373	17.69	61	2.89	152	7.21	1,149	54.51	2,108
Ramsey	3,761	70.12	1,239	23.10	181	3.37	183	3.41	2,522	47.02	5,364
Ransom	1,603	65.56	693	28.34	97	3.97	52	2.13	910	37.22	2,445
Renville	1,064	80.97	168	12.79	43	3.27	39	2.97	896	68.19	1,314
Richland	5,458	70.34	1,963	25.30	236	3.04	102	1.31	3,495	45.04	7,759
Rolette	1,496	39.72	2,151	57.12	80	2.12	39	1.04	-655	-17.39	3,766
Sargent	1,414	68.64	571	27.72	53	2.57	22	1.07	843	40.92	2,060
Sheridan	516	64.91	101	12.70	43	5.41	135	16.98	381	47.92	795
Sioux	340	28.89	667	56.67	77	6.54	93	7.90	-327	-27.78	1,177
Slope	329	77.41	40	9.41	16	3.76	40	9.41	289	68.00	425
Stark	10,499	70.84	1,977	13.34	754	5.09	1,590	10.73	8,522	57.50	14,820
Steele	714	65.63	333	30.61	24	2.21	17	1.56	381	35.02	1,088
Stutsman	7,071	72.26	1,992	20.36	395	4.04	327	3.34	5,079	51.91	9,785
Towner	861	73.78	234	20.05	30	2.57	42	3.60	627	53.73	1,167
Traill	2,755	66.84	1,201	29.14	96	2.33	70	1.70	1,554	37.70	4,122
Walsh	3,461	72.96	975	20.55	120	2.53	188	3.96	2,486	52.40	4,744
Ward	20,295	72.51	5,587	19.96	1,262	4.51	847	3.03	14,708	52.55	27,991
Wells	1,606	68.57	356	15.20	98	4.18	282	12.04	1,250	53.37	2,342
Williams	10,548	75.48	1,689	12.09	665	4.76	1,072	7.67	8,859	63.40	13,974
Totals	235,479	65.84	90,789	25.38	13,853	3.87	17,538	4.90	144,690	40.46	357,659

== Notes ==
Partisan clients

General notes
