= Brent Sanford =

Lieutenant Governor of North Dakota from 2016 to 2023

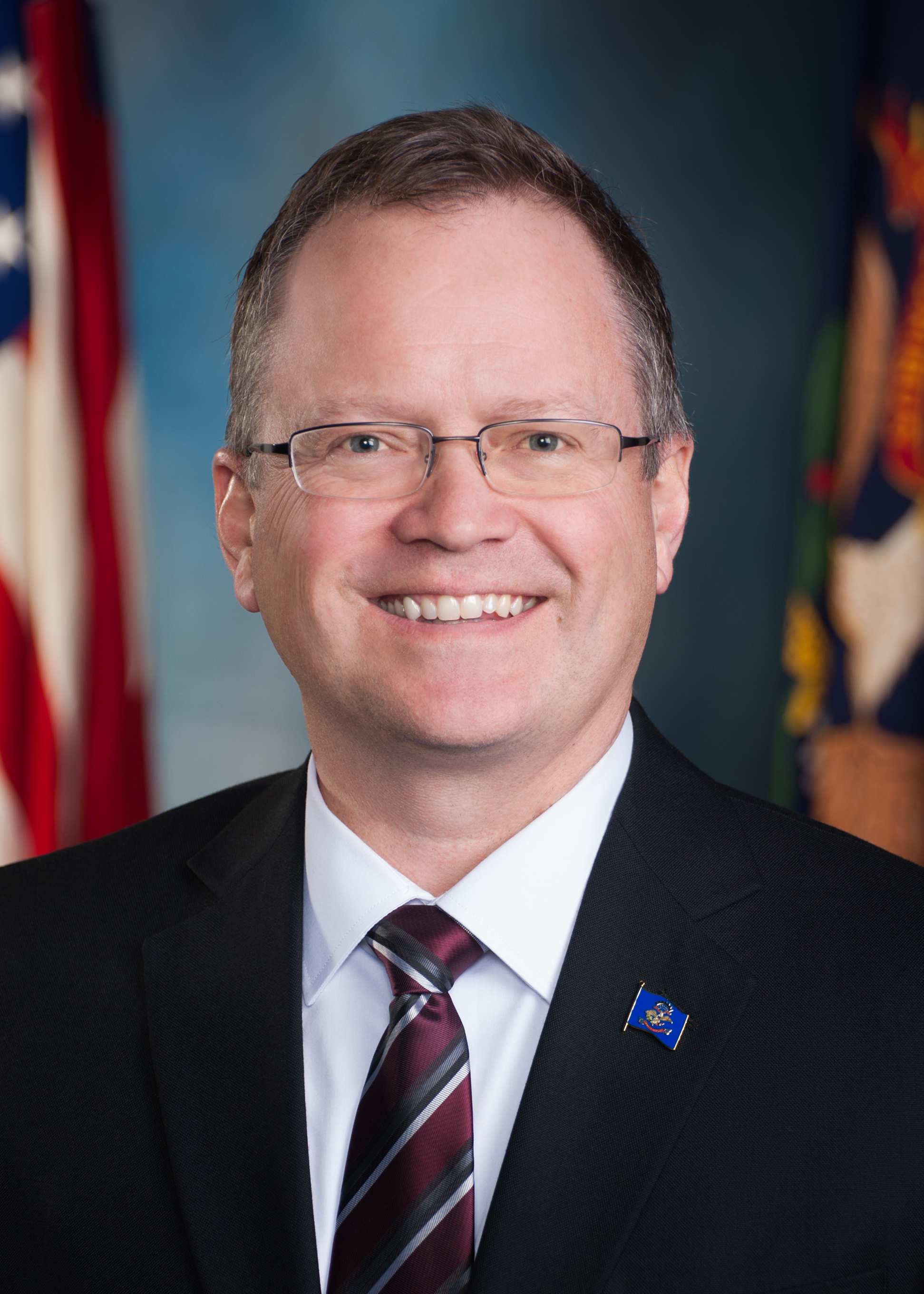
- Official portrait, 2017

Commissioner of the North Dakota University System
- Incumbent
- Assumed office September 23, 2025
- Preceded by: Position established

Interim Chancellor of the North Dakota University System
- In office April 30, 2025 – September 23, 2025
- Preceded by: Mark Hagerott
- Succeeded by: Himself (as Commissioner of the North Dakota University System

Interim President of Bismarck State College
- In office January 9, 2025 – April 29, 2025
- Preceded by: Douglas Jensen
- Succeeded by: Dan Leingang (interim)

38th Lieutenant Governor of North Dakota
- In office December 15, 2016 – January 2, 2023
- Governor: Doug Burgum
- Preceded by: Drew Wrigley
- Succeeded by: Tammy Miller

Mayor of Watford City
- In office January 1, 2010 – December 15, 2016
- Preceded by: Kent Pelton
- Succeeded by: Phil Riley

Personal details
- Born: December 23, 1971 (age 54) Watford City, North Dakota, U.S.
- Party: Republican
- Spouse: Sandra Sanford
- Children: 3
- Education: University of North Dakota (BA)

Brent Sanford (born December 23, 1971) is an American politician who is the Commissioner of the North Dakota University System. He was the 38th lieutenant governor of North Dakota from 2016 to 2023 and also served as interim president of Bismarck State College in 2025. A member of the Republican Party, he previously was Mayor of Watford City from 2010 to 2016.

== Career ==
Sanford graduated from the University of North Dakota with a bachelor's degree in accounting in 1994. He is a Certified Public Accountant. He worked for Eide Bailly LLP from 1994 through 2002, and then became the chief financial officer of Transwest Trucks in Denver, Colorado. He moved back to Watford City in 2004, taking over his family-run car dealership. He was elected to the Watford City Council in 2006, and was elected mayor in 2010, defeating Kent Pelton, the incumbent mayor.

Doug Burgum chose Sanford as his running mate in the 2016 gubernatorial election. The ticket won the general election. They won a second term in the 2020 election. On December 20, 2022, Sanford announced his resignation as lieutenant governor, effective January 2, 2023, in order to return to the private sector and spend more time with his family.

In April 2023, the North Dakota Petroleum Council hired Sanford to recruit immigrants to work on oil fields in the Bakken formation.

Sanford was appointed interim president of Bismarck State College on January 9, 2025. He continued to serve in this capacity until being appointed interim chancellor of the North Dakota University system in April 2025, being named commissioner of the North Dakota University System on September 23, 2025.

== Personal life ==
Sanford and his wife, Sandra, have three children.

Sanford's father served on the Watford City Council and his grandfather was mayor.

Party political offices
Preceded by Drew Wrigley	Republican nominee for Lieutenant Governor of North Dakota; 2016, 2020	Succeeded by Michelle Strinden
Political offices
Preceded by Drew Wrigley	Lieutenant Governor of North Dakota; 2016–2023	Succeeded by Tammy Miller
