= Multiband =

Telecoms company based in Minnetonka, Minnesota

Multiband Corporation
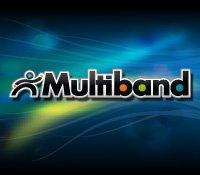
- Company type: Public Ticker AMRR
- Industry: Direct broadcast satellite, Business telephone system, Security systems, Communication systems, Telecommunication
- Founded: 1975
- Headquarters: Minnetonka, MN, U.S.
- Key people: James Frinzi
- Number of employees: Apx. 3,500
- Website: https://multibandglobal.com/

Multiband Corporation is a telecommunications company based in Minnetonka, Minnesota. The company and its subsidiaries provide voice, data, and video services to multi-dwelling unit and single-family home customers in the United States. The company operates in two segments, Home Service Provider (HSP) and Multi-Dwelling Unit (MDU). The HSP segment engages in the installation and servicing of DirecTV video programming, Internet, and home security systems for the residents of single-family homes. On February 27, 2003, MDU Communications International, Inc. ended its merger discussions with Vicom, Inc, after careful consideration.

== Home Service Provider (HSP Segment) ==
The company, through its HSP segment, receives net cash payments for the installation and service of DirecTV video programming for residents of single-family homes.

== Multi-Dwelling Unit (MDU Segment) ==
The MDU segment serves as a master service operator for DirecTV. This segment offers satellite television services to residents of multi-dwelling units through a network of affiliated system operators. As of March 15, 2010, Multiband Corporation had approximately 120,000 owned and managed subscriptions. The company was formerly known as Vicom, Incorporated and changed its name to Multiband Corporation in July 2004. Multiband Corporation was founded in 1975 and is based in Minnetonka, Minnesota.

== Products and services ==
- Sales & Support Center
- Field Services - DirecTV full-service home service providers
- Largest nationwide DirecTV master system operator in the Multiple Dwelling Unit (MDU) market
