= Eide Bailly =

Advisory firm

Eide Bailly Advisory LLC & Eide Bailly LLP
- Trade name: Eide Bailly
- Type: Private
- Industry: Professional services
- Predecessor: Charles Bailly & Co.; Eide Helmeke & Co.
- Headquarters: Fargo, North Dakota
- Number of locations: 50 (2026)
- Area served: United States
- Key people: Jeremy Hauk (CEO); Andy Spillum (COO); Andy Kaiser (Board Chair)
- Services: Assurance; Tax; Financial Advisory; Consulting
- Revenue: ▲US$840 million (2026)
- Owners: Eide Bailly LLP; Limited Partners (100%)
- Number of employees: 3,500 (2026)
- Parent: Eide Bailly Advisory LLC; Eide Bailly Intermediate LLC (2026–present)
- Subsidiaries: Eide Bailly Shared Services Pvt. Ltd.
- Website: www.eidebailly.com

Eide Bailly Advisory LLC and Eide Bailly LLP (each doing business under the trade name Eide Bailly) are American mid-tier advisory and accounting firms based in Minneapolis, Minnesota. They primarily provide accounting, advisory, tax, and assurance services.

The current accounting partnership traces its roots back to 1917 and was formally founded in 1998 by a merger of two namesake regional accounting firms: Eide Helmeke & Co. and Charles Bailly & Co. In 2026, to accommodate a $1.8 billion equity investment by Reverence Capital Partners, the firm's non-attest operations were reorganized into an advisory entity. As of 2026, that advisory entity employs almost all of the approximately 3,500 professionals across 50 offices in 20 states.

The firm is recognized as a top CPA firm by trade publications based on its revenue in the United States, with significant inorganic growth occurring after 2017.

== History ==
=== Early history ===
The partnership has origins to 1917 as Bishop Brissman & Co. in Fargo, North Dakota. In 1944, the practice was renamed Cull Eide & Co. after Oliver A. Eide was admitted as a partner. Following several significant regulatory and industry changes between the 1940s and 1960s, Cull Eide & Co. had been recast to Eide, Helmeke, Boelz & Pasch as it began to acquire offices in Bismarck, North Dakota, Sioux Falls, South Dakota, and Aberdeen, South Dakota through the late 1960s. Later in 1981 becoming known as Eide Helmeke & Co. as it continued to grow and add offices in Phoenix, Arizona and Minneapolis through the 1980s.

Separately, Charles E. Bailly moved to Fargo to open a second location of Broeker Hendrickson in 1950. During 1978, nine partners left Broeker Hendrickson to form Charles Bailly & Co., establishing the second predecessor firm with offices in Fargo and Bismarck, North Dakota. Around the same time in the 1980s, Charles Bailly & Co. added offices in Sioux Falls, South Dakota, Minneapolis, Billings, Montana, and Dubuque, Iowa.

In 1998, Eide Helmeke & Co. and Charles Bailly & Co. merged to form Eide Bailly LLP. The combined partnership began with 55 partners and nine offices with approximately $40 million in revenue.

=== Recent history ===
For the next 25 years, the firm grew both organically and through continued mergers, adding 38 office locations across the Western United States through 2023. Annual revenue reached $100 million in 2007, and during the first half of 2012, Eide Bailly and Wipfli announced a proposed merger, which eventually was abandoned before closing.

Eide Bailly marked its 100th anniversary in 2017 while exceeding $250 million in total revenue. In 2019 the firm opened an India office to offshore work. The firm then passed $500 million in revenue in 2022 and $750 million in 2025. Around that same time, Eide Bailly sold it's wealth management division and also introduced an updated brand identity and logo.

In August 2026, Eide Bailly LLP completed the sale of a majority stake to private equity firm Reverence Capital Partners, valuing the business at $1.8 billion. To comply with regulatory restrictions on the practice of accountancy and firm ownership, the partnership reorganized into an alternative practice structure with an administrative agreement, where Eide Bailly Advisory LLC provides all services except audit and attest, which are still performed by the CPA-led partnership.

=== Eide Bailly Alliance ===
The firm also manages the Eide Bailly Alliance, a member network of independent accounting firms across the United States.

== Services ==
The firm operates four core service lines: assurance, tax, client accounting services, and business advisory and consulting.
