= Joe Miller (North Dakota politician) =

American politician

Member of the North Dakota Senate from the 10th district
- In office 2009–2016

Personal details
- Party: Republican
- Spouse: Ashleigh
- Education: Valley City State University
- Profession: Politician, farmer

Joe Miller is an American politician. He served as a Republican member of the North Dakota Senate from 2009 to 2016.

== Biography ==
Miller graduated from Valley City State University, earning a B.A. in social science.

Miller was elected to the North Dakota Senate in 2008 as a republican from the 16th district (following redistricting, the 10th district). He successfully challenged and unseated democratic incumbent senator Harvey D. Tallackson. He was reelected in 2012 against democrat Daryl Passa. He retired from the senate in 2016 and he did not seek reelection.

In the 2016 North Dakota gubernatorial election, Miller endorsed Doug Burgum over Marvin Nelson.

Miller is catholic.
