= Dakota High School =

Dakota High School can refer to

- Dakota Collegiate, Winnipeg, Manitoba, Canada
- Dakota Junior Senior High School, Dakota, Illinois, United States
- Dakota High School (Fargo, North Dakota), Fargo, North Dakota, United States
- Dakota High School (Michigan), Macomb Township, Michigan, United States
- Category:High schools in South Dakota
- Category:High schools in North Dakota
