= Davies High School =

Public high school in North Dakota, United States

Judge Ronald N. Davies High School

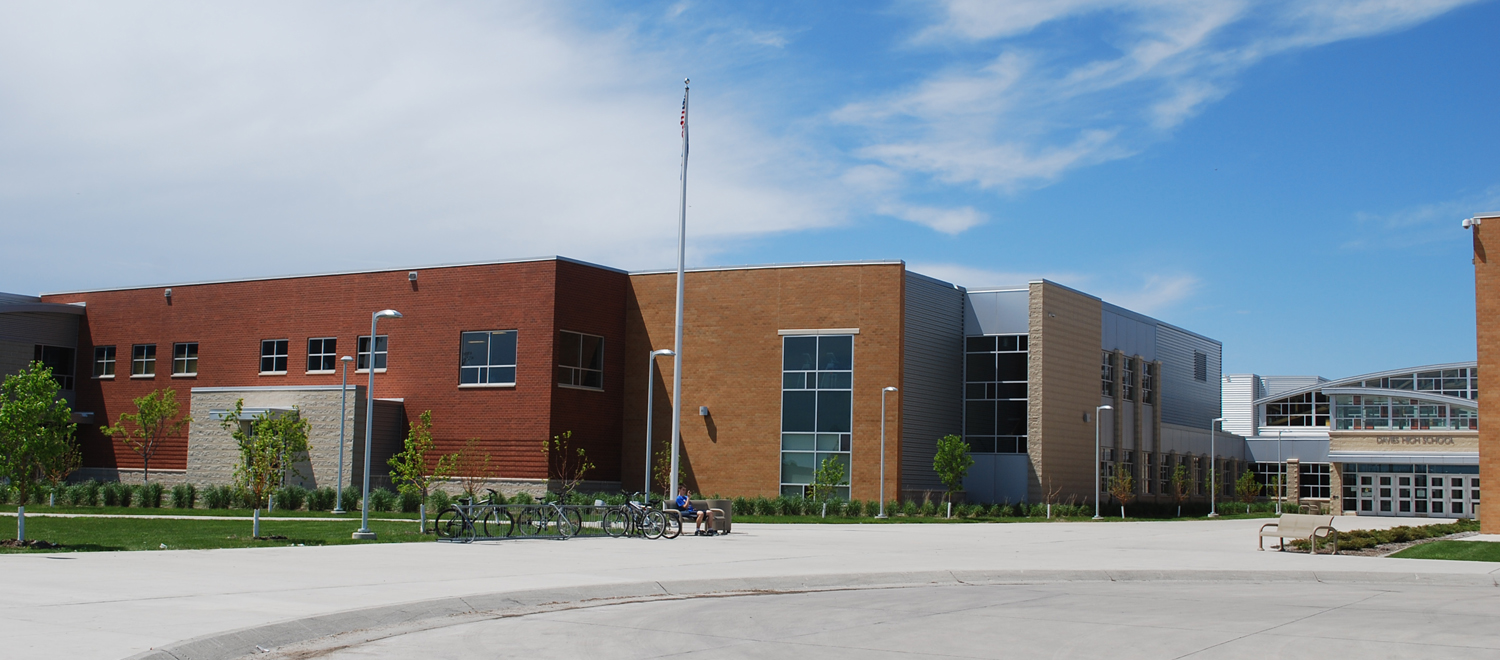
- View from the east entrance

Location
- 7150 25th Street South; Fargo, North Dakota 58104; United States; 46°46′49″N 96°49′02″W

Information
- Type: Public high school
- Motto: Educating and Empowering All Students to Succeed
- School district: Fargo Public Schools
- NCES School ID: 380678000855
- Principal: Sean Safranski
- Teaching staff: 95.55 (on an FTE basis)
- Grades: 9–12
- Enrollment: 1,339 (2023-2024)
- Student to teacher ratio: 14.01
- Campus size: 76.5 Acres
- Campus type: Open
- Color: Cardinal red Vegas gold
- Athletics conference: North Dakota High School Activities Association
- Mascot: Talon The Eagle
- Nickname: Davies
- Team name: Eagles
- Newspaper: The Talon
- Website: www.fargo.k12.nd.us/davies

Davies High School is a public high school in Fargo, North Dakota, United States. It is part of the Fargo Public Schools district and was named after Ronald Davies, a former North Dakota based federal judge best known for ordering the integration of Little Rock Central High School during the civil rights crisis of the 1960s.

== History ==
Davies High School has its origins in the first-ever Community Dialogue, held in 2002. Several hundred members of the community voiced their preferences on how the district could better serve its families, in regard to class and building size, grade configurations, and proximity to schools. This charted a course for the Long Range Facility Plan (LRFP) in 2003, which included a district-wide configuration of grade K-5 elementary schools, grade 6–8 middle schools, and grade 9–12 high schools.

In 2004, a Transition Task Force made up of administrators, teachers, parents, and consultants began meeting for discussions and decisions relating to the new configuration. In the spring of 2005, updates were made to the LRFP to reflect the eventual construction of a third high school, and the board held a series of public meetings to discuss the LRFP and the impending school boundary changes coming in 2006.

In the fall of 2007, the board opened the naming process to all students, parents, and community members. It also held a public meeting to discuss and collect input on the early stages of planning for the new facility, and issued $43 million in bonds to fund the new high school. Five potential names were finalized for the new school: Lake Agassiz, Ronald Davies, Dakota, Great Plains, and Liberty. The name of Judge Ronald N. Davies – the federal district judge from Fargo whose decisions in Little Rock in 1957 opened the door for desegregation of the nation's schools with the Little Rock Nine – was chosen for the building.

In the spring of 2008, the mascot and colors were chosen through both public and student input. The board also held a public meeting with citizens, and classroom meetings with middle school students, to gain input on several transition plans for students into the new high school. In October of that year, the district held a formal ceremony with members of the Davies family, the district, and community. Construction lasted nearly three years. On August 21, 2011, amid several days of fanfare and public events, the new building opened to students and the community.

In 2021, Davies High was selected as the only school in North Dakota to fly the national Freedom Flag, as well as to temporarily have a piece of steel from the World Trade Center towers. The flag is to be flown each September in remembrance of the September 11th attacks.

== Athletics ==
Davies High School is a part of the North Dakota High School Activities Association. Varsity athletic programs for Davies were developed through identified Davies student populations in both South High School and South Campus II several years ago. Although they were housed at South High, Davies teams began competing independently using their new identity in 2009, with new teams emerging as they had sufficient participation numbers to stand alone. Davies Highschool is a member of the Eastern Dakota Conference for all athletics.

The school's athletic mascot is the Eagles.

Davies High School offers baseball, basketball, cheerleading, cross country, danceline, football, golf, ice hockey, soccer, softball, swimming and diving, team managers, tennis, track, volleyball, and wrestling.

== Notable alumni ==
- Audra Mari (Class of 2012), was crowned Miss World America 2016 on July 8, 2016 and represented the United States at Miss World 2016.
- Jessamine "Jesse" Burgum (Class of 2014), Forbes 30 Under 30 (2025), daughter of Doug Burgum
- Dylan Berg (Class of 2014), songwriter for the Polo G song Pop Out.
- CJ Lotzer (Class of 2015), co-creator of CBOYSTV a YouTube channel amassing over 5 million subscribers.
- Tyler Kleven (Class of 2020), American professional ice hockey defenseman for the Ottawa Senators
