= Woodrow Wilson School (Fargo, North Dakota) =

- U.S. National Register of Historic Places
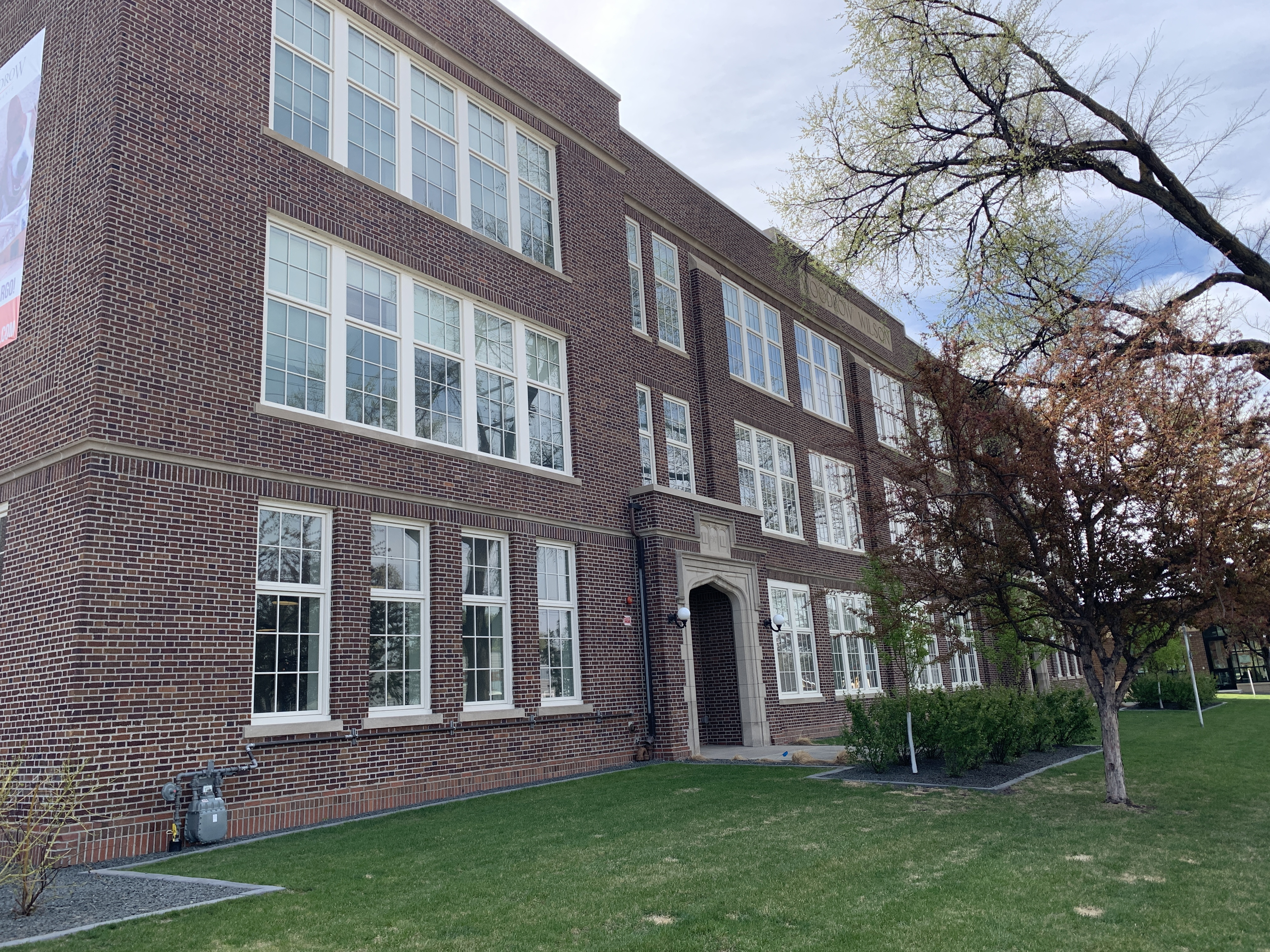

- Location within North Dakota Location within the United States
- Location: 315 N. University Dr., Fargo, North Dakota
- Coordinates: 46°52′48″N 96°47′51″W
- Built: 1917
- Architect: Haxby and Braseth
- Architectural style: Collegiate Gothic
- NRHP reference No.: 12000881
- Added to NRHP: October 24, 2012

The Woodrow Wilson School in Fargo, North Dakota is a historic building that is listed on the National Register of Historic Places. It was added to the Registry on October 24, 2012, as entry #12000881. It was deemed notable for its Collegiate Gothic design by local architects Haxby and Braseth. The school "is also a good example of how design changed to meet Progressive-era education ideas."

It is Fargo's 2nd oldest surviving school building, was the city's only high school until 1921, and it served the community as a school for 95 years. Originally the school served elementary grades and also provided adult education in the evenings; it later was used as an alternative high school, complementing three other high schools in the Fargo Public Schools district, until 2012.

The actual school moved to the Agassiz Building at 1305 S. Ninth Avenue in March, 2012. In 2021, it was renamed to "Dakota High School" due to concerns about racist policies of the former president.

== Conversion to Apartment ==
In the 2010s Doug Burgum's Kilbourn Group purchased the historical site and refurbished the building into an apartment complex. The apartment keeps the historical side of the former school preserved while constructing a new wing where the parking lot used to be.
