= Fargo Public Schools =

School district in North Dakota, U.S.

Location
- 415 North 4th Street Fargo, North Dakota; United States
- Coordinates: 46°52′51″N 96°47′02″W

District information
- Type: Public
- Motto: "Educating and Empowering All Students to Succeed"
- Grades: K-12
- Established: 1872; 154 years ago
- Superintendent: Cory Steiner
- NCES District ID: 3806780

Students and staff
- Students: 11,378 (August 2023)
- Student–teacher ratio: 13.08 (2021)

Other information
- Website: www.fargo.k12.nd.us

Fargo Public Schools (FPS) is a public school district in Fargo, North Dakota, United States. The district owns and operates in three comprehensive high schools, three middle schools, and fourteen elementary schools. FPS also operates an alternative high school and a special needs pre-school.

== Governance and funding ==
The Fargo Public Schools is governed by a nine-member Board of Education, whose members may serve an unlimited number of four-year terms. Board members oversee the district's annual operating budget, which is $134 million during the 2013–14 school year. Currently, the school district's operating levy is 139 mills. Sixty-nine percent of the district's general fund revenue comes from the state's foundation aid. The balance comes from property tax (30%), and the remaining 1% comprises federal funding, interest, and other sources. Of its expenses, 57% goes to Salaries. The remaining expenses include benefits (19%), fund transfers (6%), supplies (5%), purchased property services (5%), transportation and travel (4%), equipment (2%), contracted services (2%), and the remaining dues, fees, and registrations at less than 1%.

== Staff ==
The school system employs more than 1,800 permanent employees. Included in that number are approximately 965 teachers, of which 59 percent hold a master's degree or higher. Specialists are placed in all district elementary buildings, to deliver instruction in visual arts, library/media services, music, and physical education.

All of the district's teachers meet weekly in Professional Learning Communities, or PLCs, in order to improve teaching practices and student learning. Secondary teachers attend professional development days each semester that focus on improving the District's educational process. This is in addition to the weekly professional development sessions offered to individuals and small groups throughout the year.

Also among its staff, through a partnership and cost-sharing agreement with the City of Fargo, are seven School Resource Officers], police officers who are placed in the district's middle and high schools. They are a part of the Cass-Clay Unified School Response Network, which originated in the Fargo Public Schools in the mid-2000s.

== Curriculum ==
In 2011, the Fargo Public Schools was awarded a 5-year certification as an accredited school district by the North Central Association Commission on Accreditation and School Improvement. Its curriculum and education delivery is guided by a Strategic Plan developed in 2000, which focuses on seven goals: academic performance, the arts, character, citizenship, communication, life skills, and self-reliance.

The district offers high school students 213 courses within 25 curriculum areas. Advanced Placement (AP) courses include AP Biology, AP Calculus, AP Chemistry, AP Computer Science, AP Economics, AP United States Government and Politics, AP Physics, AP Psychology, and AP Statistics in addition to language and the arts. Career & Technical Education curriculum in the Fargo Public Schools includes automotive, industrial, graphic arts, manufacturing, and information technologies.

Through its special education department, the school district serves over 1,300 children with special needs, ages 3–21.

Other academic and extracurricular programming offered by the district includes gifted services, summer school, remedial learning, arts education, and latch-key programs through the YMCA and Fargo-Moorhead Youth Commission.

At the middle level, the district offers an Individualized Learning Center (ILC) program, where the student receives differentiated instruction (tailoring a pupil's teaching to his or her learning needs) in a small group setting for the purposes of tutoring or homework. Service learning (community volunteerism) is sometimes a part of the ILC experience, depending on location.

== Configuration ==
The district educates its students through a citywide grade-level configuration of grade K-5 elementary schools, grade 6-8 middle schools, and grade 9-12 high schools. The district's elementary and middle school buildings constructed and/or remodeled after 1994 utilize the shared “pod” or “team center” concept, which assigns groups of students and teachers together for interconnected teaching and learning using common resources.

== Activities ==
The district offers, on average, more than 50 extracurricular activities at each of the comprehensive high schools. This includes athletics, clubs, music, and the performing arts. Many directly relate to or include academic coursework.

== Honors ==
Since 1999, the Fargo Public Schools has been named 13 times to the “100 Best Communities for Music Education,” a national survey by the NAMM Foundation which evaluates several criteria, including time reserved for music education, the budget, staff collaboration, professional development, how music standards are taught, equipment provided by the school district, and administrative support. In 2011, the district's School Resource Officer program was recognized as the Model Program of the Year by the National Association of School Resource Officers.

== Controversies ==
In 2022, the Fargo school board voted 7-2 to stop saying the Pledge of Allegiance at school board meetings School Board Vice President said "Given that the word 'God' in the text of the Pledge of Allegiance is capitalized," Holden said. "The text is clearly referring to the Judeo-Christian god and therefore, it does not include any other face such as Islam, Hinduism, Buddhism, all of which are practiced by our staff and students at FPS.". This was met with condemnation from Senators Kevin Cramer, and Ted Cruz as well as country music band Big & Rich. Former School Board member David Paulson said on Laura Ingraham that "he (Seth Holden, School board VP) said he's a socialist and he does not believe in god and that he did not need to stand to show his patriotism". Following the decision by the Fargo School Board, Governor Doug Burgum announced that he was working with the state legislature to guarantee that the opportunity exists to recite the Pledge of Allegiance. On August 18, 2022, the board voted to reinstate the Pledge of Allegiance at their bi weekly meetings.

== Schools ==
=== High schools (9-12) ===
- Davies High School (comprehensive high school)
- Fargo North High School (comprehensive high school)
- Fargo South High School (comprehensive high school)
- Dakota High School (alternative high school)

=== Middle schools (6-8) ===
- Ben Franklin Middle School
- Carl Ben Eielson Middle School
- Discovery Middle School

=== Elementary schools (K-5) ===
- Bennett Elementary School
- Centennial Elementary School
- Clara Barton Hawthorne Elementary School
- Eagles Elementary school
- Ed Clapp Elementary school
- Horace Mann Roosevelt Elementary School
- Jefferson Elementary School
- Kennedy Elementary School
- Lewis and Clark Elementary School
- Lincoln Elementary School
- Longfellow Elementary School
- Madison Elementary School
- McKinley Elementary School
- Washington Elementary School

== See also ==
- Woodrow Wilson School (Fargo, North Dakota): former school building on the National Register of Historic Places
