= Harvey D. Tallackson =

American politician (1925–2022)

Member of the North Dakota Senate
- In office 1977–2008

Personal details
- Born: May 15, 1925 Grafton, North Dakota, U.S.
- Died: July 27, 2022 (aged 97) St. Paul, Minnesota, U.S.
- Party: Democratic
- Spouse: Glenna Mae Walstad (m. 1946; died 2020)
- Children: 5

Harvey Dean Tallackson (May 15, 1925 – July 27, 2022) was an American politician. He served as a Democratic member of the North Dakota Senate.

== Life and career ==
Tallackson was born on May 15, 1925, in Grafton, North Dakota. His parents were Arthur J. Tallackson Sr. (1895–1970) and Mabel R. McDougald (1895–1964). Tallackson married his high school sweetheart Glenna Walstad in 1946. They had five children together.

Tallackson was an insurance salesman and farmer.

Tallackson served in the North Dakota Senate as a democrat from 1977 to 2008. He was reelected narrowly in 2000 and 2004, with 52% and 53% of the vote, respectively. He lost reelection in 2008 to republican Joe Miller, receiving less than 40% of the vote.

Tallackson's wife, Glenna, died in March, 2020. He died two years later on July 27, 2022, at the age of 97, in St. Paul, Minnesota. He and his wife are buried at Zion Cemetery, in Walsh County, North Dakota.
