= Dakota High School (Fargo, North Dakota) =

Coordinates: 46.8661°N 96.7996°W

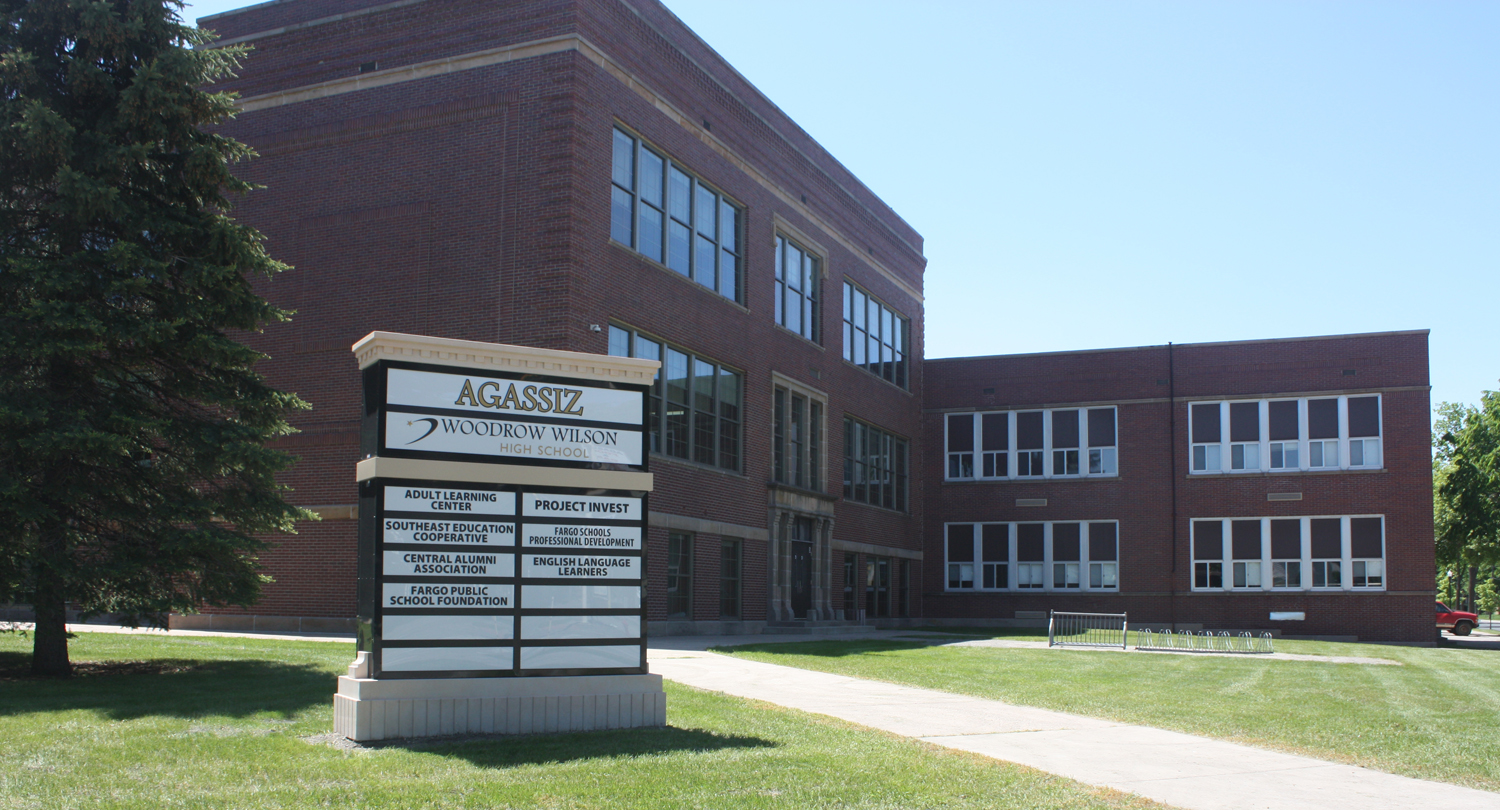
- Agassiz Building, located in Fargo, ND, which houses Dakota High School; as seen from the north entrance to the building.

Location
- 1305 9th Ave S Fargo, North Dakota 58103; USA

Information
- Type: Public/Alternative
- Established: 1917
- Locale: Agassiz Building, 1305 South 9th Avenue
- School district: Fargo Public Schools
- Principal: David Burkman
- Teaching staff: 9.60 (FTE)
- Grades: 11-12
- Enrollment: 117 (2023–2024)
- Student to teacher ratio: 12.19
- Colors: Black and Gold
- Website: dakota.fargo.k12.nd.us

Dakota High School is a public high school located in Fargo, North Dakota. It currently serves about 130 students in grades 11 through 12 and is a part of the Fargo Public Schools system. The school operates as an alternative learning model to the District's other three comprehensive high schools, Fargo North High School, Fargo South High School, and Davies High School.

Dakota High School is an alternative high school program. Learning goals and graduation requirements are the same as at other Fargo Public Schools high schools, though the format and climate differ significantly. Class sizes are capped at 18 students, and every student is assigned a staff advisor. This practice allows the school to focus on the needs of each individual student. Students attend two classes per day. Classes are 2 1/2 hours in length and should take an average of 27 days to complete. Some classes are self-paced while others are teacher-directed. The basic structure and rules of this alternative school make students responsible for their own educational experiences.

== History ==
Originally known as "Woodrow Wilson High School" when it opened in 1917, the program moved from its original building on North University Drive in March 2012. The historic building is on the National Historic Register. The high school itself has been moved to the Agassiz Building one mile south. Dakota High School shares Agassiz space with the Fargo Adult Learning Center, Early Childhood Special Education, Middle School Alternative Education Day Program (EDP), Project InVest (post high school life skill transition Special Education program) and EvenStart pre-school and the offices of several District programs and community partners.

In July 2020, in the aftermath of the murder of George Floyd, the Fargo Human Relations Commission unanimously voted to recommend the Fargo School Board rename the school because of Woodrow Wilson's racist policies against African-Americans, including the decision to re-segregate the federal workforce. In 2021, Woodrow Wilson High School was renamed to "Dakota High School".
