= Fargo North High School =

Coordinates: 46°54′14″N 96°47′25″W

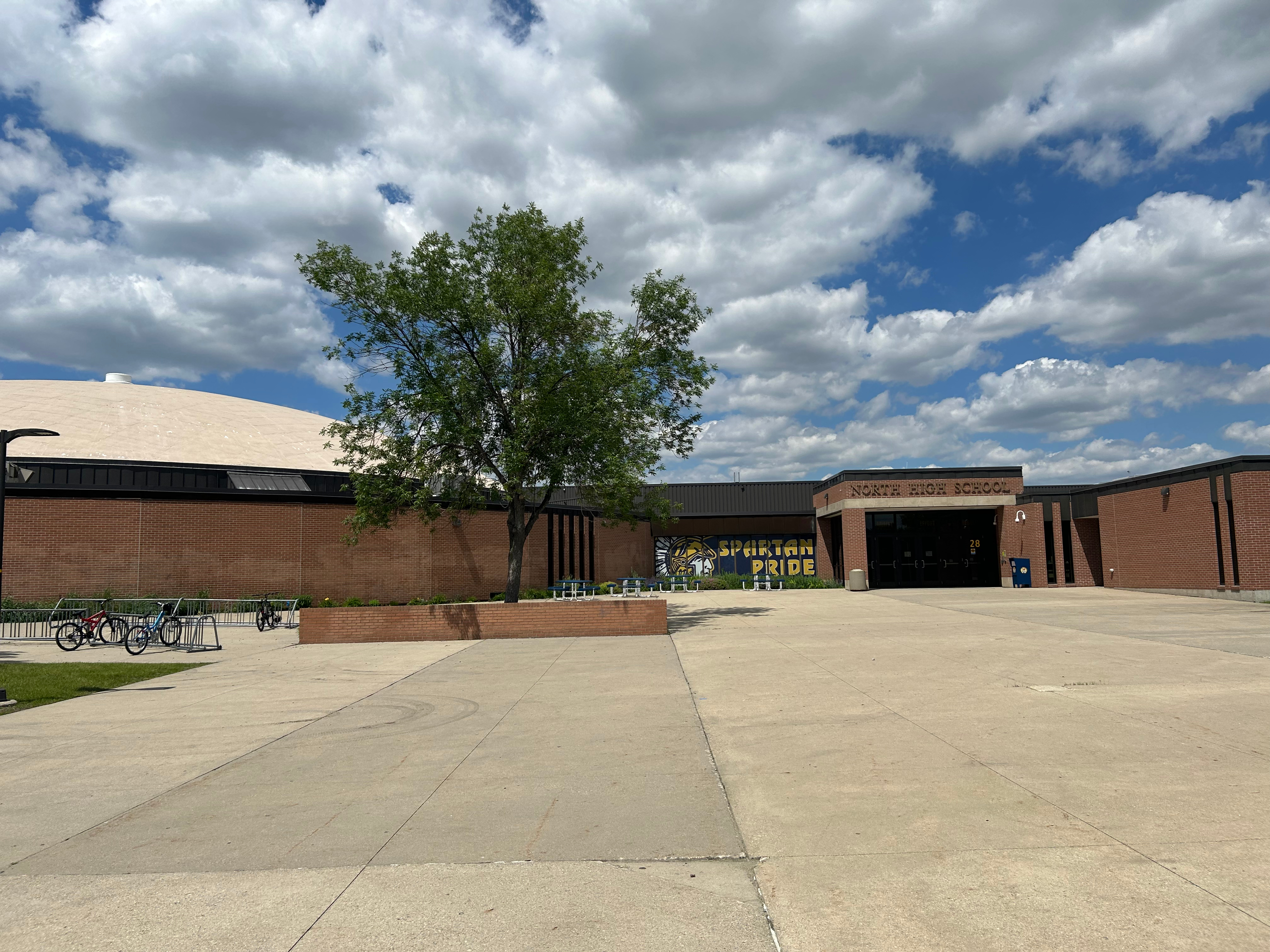
- View from the south entrance

Location
- 801 17th Ave N Fargo, North Dakota; United States

Information
- Type: Public
- Motto: "Strive for excellence"
- Established: 1966
- School district: Fargo Public Schools
- Principal: Travis Christensen
- Teaching staff: 84.30 (FTE)
- Grades: 9–12
- Enrollment: 1,112 (2023–2024)
- Student to teacher ratio: 13.19
- Colors: Navy blue and gold
- Mascot: Spartans
- Website: north.fargo.k12.nd.us

Fargo North High School, more commonly known in the district as Fargo North or North High, is a public high school located in Fargo, North Dakota, United States. It currently serves over 1,100 students in grades 9–12 and is a part of the Fargo Public Schools system. The official school colors are navy blue and gold, and its mascot is the Spartans.

== Athletics ==
=== Fall athletics ===
The fall athletic season at Fargo North consists of Cheer Team, Cross Country - Boys, Cross Country - Girls, Dance Team, Football, Golf - Girls, Soccer - Boys, Swim/Dive - Girls, Tennis - Boys, and Volleyball.

=== Winter athletics ===
The winter athletic season at Fargo North consists of Basketball - Boys, Basketball - Girls, Cheer Team, Dance Team, Gymnastics, Hockey - Boys, Hockey - Girls, Swim/Dive - Boys, Wrestling - Boys, and Wrestling - Girls.

=== Spring athletics ===
The spring athletic season at Fargo North consists of Baseball, Golf - Boys, Soccer - Girls, Softball, Tennis - Girls, Track & Field - Boys, and Track & Field - Girls.

== Fine arts ==
=== Music ===
The music department of Fargo North consists of three concert bands, two jazz bands, two concert choirs, one jazz choir, two concert orchestras, and one symphony orchestra.

==== Choir ====
There are four choirs offered at Fargo North: a treble choir (formerly known as the women's choir), a mixed choir, a concert choir, and the 19th Avenue Jazz Choir. The jazz choir is the only one joined by audition and also includes two sound technicians. Female freshmen take part in the treble choir, and female upperclassmen may as well if they so choose. The mixed choir features freshman boys and all sophomore students. The concert choir is where the majority of juniors and seniors sing.

==== Band ====
The band program is for all grades and includes a freshman concert band, a non audition symphonic band for grades 10-12, and an auditioned wind ensemble for grades 9-12. There are two jazz bands, one by audition and the other open. Band students frequently participate in pep band during sporting events.

==== Orchestra ====
There are three string orchestras: one featuring freshman, known as the Spartan orchestra, another for students in grades 10–12, known as the symphony orchestra, and an audition group for all grades, known as the chamber orchestra. The chamber orchestra rehearses on their own time after school hours as a small group of musicians. Occasionally, the orchestra is joined by band students playing woodwind, brass, percussion, and sometimes, although seldom, voice accompaniment from the choir.

=== Drama ===
Fargo North Theatre activities include International Thespian Society Troupe #4561, a technical theatre crew, and Performing Arts classes. There are three main shows a year - a musical in the fall, a one-act play in the winter that also performs at the Fargo Area One-Act Festival, and a straight show in the spring. Fargo North also has an improv group called the Improvinati, which puts on performances monthly.

== Incidents ==
The school suffered a lockdown on April 17th, 2026 after multiple threats of a school shooter.

== Notable alumni ==
- Danny Irmen - Professional hockey player
- Cynthia Kierscht - US government official
- James Lileks - writer for The Minneapolis Star Tribune and National Review
- Roxana Saberi – Former journalist; former Miss North Dakota 1996; accused of espionage by Iran; Hall of Fame inductee, 1997
- Jule Selbo – television writer
- Timm Sharp – television actor
- Ryan Lance - 3 time Emmy award winning musician/ The Blenders
- Paul Marquart - Minnesota politician
- Blair Thoreson - North Dakota politician
