= Tyler Kleven =

American ice hockey player (born 2002)

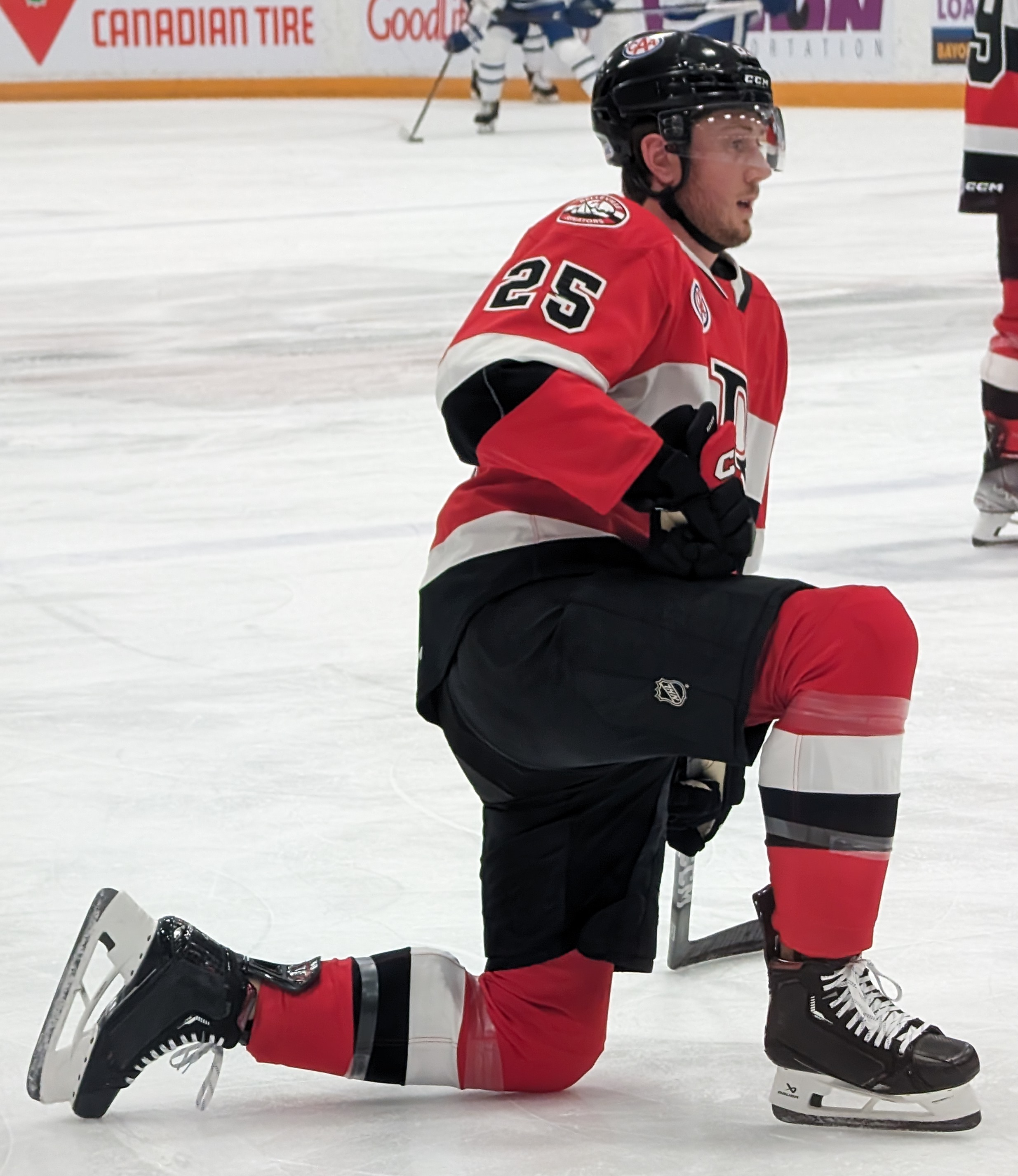
- Kleven with the Belleville Senators in 2024
- Born: January 10, 2002 (age 24) Fargo, North Dakota, U.S.
- Height: 6 ft 4 in (193 cm)
- Weight: 225 lb (102 kg; 16 st 1 lb)
- Position: Defense
- Shoots: Left
- NHL team: Ottawa Senators
- National team: United States
- NHL draft: 44th overall, 2020; Ottawa Senators
- Playing career: 2023–present

Tyler Kleven (born January 10, 2002) is an American professional ice hockey player who is a defenseman for the Ottawa Senators of the National Hockey League (NHL). He played college hockey with the University of North Dakota. He was selected 44th overall in the second round of the 2020 NHL entry draft by the Senators. After leaving college, he began his professional career with the Senators in 2023.

== Early life ==
Kleven was born January 10, 2002, in Fargo, North Dakota, to Chris and Lori Kleven. His father, a former defenseman for the Waterloo Black Hawks of the United States Hockey League (USHL) and the Northern Michigan Wildcats, built a backyard ice rink for Kleven and coached him as a child. Originally a forward, Kleven switched to playing defense at the age of eight to better accommodate his defensive mindset.

== Playing career ==
=== Amateur ===
Kleven joined the University of North Dakota (UND) hockey program in 2020 after spending two seasons with the U.S. National Development Program in the United States Hockey League. In his first season with the Fighting Hawks in 2020–21, he made 22 appearances, scoring five goals and two assists for seven points. The team topped the National Collegiate Hockey Conference (NCHC) earning the Penrose Cup, and won the Frozen Faceoff as playoff champions. This marked the first time a team in the NCHC and earned both titles. The Fighting Hawks advanced to the 2021 NCAA Tournament, where they were knocked out by University of Minnesota Duluth in the longest game in NCAA tournament history.

In his sophomore season with UND in 2021–22, he played in 38 games, scoring seven goals and ten points. The Fighting Hawks tied the University of Denver atop the regular season standings to share the 2022 Penrose Cup, but were knocked out in the playoff semifinals by Western Michigan University. As league co-champions they were invited to the 2022 NCAA Tournament, but were eliminated by the University of Notre Dame in the regional round.

In his final season with UND in 2022–23, Kleven was suspended on January 14, 2023 for one game for a hit-to-the-head of an opponent. He was automatically given a one-game suspension on February 11, after receiving his fourth game misconduct of the season in a game against the University of Denver. During his college career, Kleven was suspended three times. He finished the season with eight goals and 18 points in 35 games. UND made to the NCHC Frozen Faceoff semifinals before losing to St. Cloud State University. In his three years with the Fighting Hawks he was known for his shot from the point, marking 20 goals and 35 points in 95 games with UND.

=== Professional ===
Kleven was selected 44th overall by the National Hockey League (NHL)'s Ottawa Senators in the second round of the 2020 NHL entry draft. He signed a three-year entry-level contract on March 23, 2023, with the Senators. He previously played with Senators teammates Jake Sanderson, Shane Pinto and Jacob Bernard-Docker at UND. An injury to Jakob Chychrun allowed Kleven to play in his first NHL game shortly after joining the team. He made his NHL debut against the Philadelphia Flyers on March 30, 2023. Another injury to a defenseman during the game, this time Travis Hamonic, forced coach D. J. Smith to play Kleven more than he would have liked, but it allowed Kleven to notch his first NHL point, an assist on a Claude Giroux goal in the third. The Senators won the game 5–4. He finished the season having played eight games registering two assists.

Kleven attended Ottawa's 2023 training camp but was assigned to the team's American Hockey League (AHL) affiliate, the Belleville Senators, to start the 2023–24 season. After injuries to Thomas Chabot and Erik Brännström, Kleven was recalled by Ottawa on October 28. He appeared in five games, with one assist before being returned to Belleville on 19 November. He was recalled on March 28, 2024, again replacing an injured Thomas Chabot. Kleven appeared in four games with Ottawa before being returned to Belleville on April 5 after Chabot returned from injury. He finished the season with one assist for a total of one point in nine games with Ottawa, and five goals and 21 points in 53 games for Belleville. Belleville qualified for the playoffs for the second time in franchise history and faced the Toronto Marlies in the first round. They advanced to the second round after knocking off the Marlies, facing the Cleveland Monsters. However, Belleville in turn was eliminated by Cleveland. He also added one goal and two assists in Belleville's seven playoff games.

For the 2024–25 season, Kleven made the Ottawa Senators out of training camp and was in the opening night roster. He scored his first NHL goal against Mackenzie Blackwood on November 27 in a 4–3 win against the San Jose Sharks. He finished the season with four goals and ten points in 79 games. The Senators qualified for the playoffs, facing the Toronto Maple Leafs in the opening round. He made his NHL playoff debut on April 20 in Game 1 of the series. In Game 2, Kleven recorded his first NHL playoff point, assisting on the Adam Gaudette's game-tying goal in the third period. The Senators were eliminated in six games in their best-of-seven series. In the series, Kleven tallied two assists.

As a restricted free agent in the 2025 offseason, Kleven signed a two-year, $3.2M contract with the Senators. In the 2025–26 season, Kleven predominantly played on the team's third pairing and made 70 appearances, registering three goals and 18 points. On March 8, 2026, he was fined the maximum amount by the NHL for an illegal cross-check against the Seattle Kraken's Jared McCann on March 7. In April he was struck in the face by a shot and missed the remainder of the regular season. The Senators made the playoffs again, and Kleven returned from injury in game three, but Ottawa was swept in the first round by the Carolina Hurricanes. He played two games in the series, going scoreless.

== International play ==
Medal record

Representing United States

Ice hockey

World Junior Championships
Gold medal – first place	2021 Canada	

Kleven played for Team USA at the IIHF World Junior Championship in 2021 and 2022 and won gold in 2021.

Following the end of the NHL season, Kleven joined the Team USA at the 2023 IIHF World Championship. The team finished fourth in the tournament.

== Career statistics ==
=== Regular season and playoffs ===
			Regular season					Playoffs
Season	Team	League	GP	G	A	Pts	PIM	GP	G	A	Pts	PIM
2017–18	Fargo Davies High	USHS	27	9	7	16	54	—	—	—	—	—
2018–19	U.S. National Development Team	USHL	31	2	1	3	45	2	0	0	0	19
2019–20	U.S. National Development Team	USHL	17	0	2	2	37	—	—	—	—	—
2020–21	University of North Dakota	NCHC	22	5	2	7	37	—	—	—	—	—
2021–22	University of North Dakota	NCHC	38	7	3	10	93	—	—	—	—	—
2022–23	University of North Dakota	NCHC	35	8	10	18	84	—	—	—	—	—
2022–23	Ottawa Senators	NHL	8	0	2	2	2	—	—	—	—	—
2023–24	Belleville Senators	AHL	53	5	16	21	51	7	1	2	3	6
2023–24	Ottawa Senators	NHL	9	0	1	1	2	—	—	—	—	—
2024–25	Ottawa Senators	NHL	79	4	6	10	27	6	0	2	2	6
2025–26	Ottawa Senators	NHL	70	3	15	18	53	2	0	0	0	2
NHL totals			166	7	24	31	84	8	0	2	2	8

=== International ===
Year	Team	Event	Results	GP	G	A	Pts	PIM
2018	United States	U17	8th	5	0	0	0	16
2021	United States	WJC	1st place, gold medalist(s)	2	0	1	1	0
2022	United States	WJC	5th	5	0	0	0	0
2023	United States	WC	4th	7	0	0	0	2
Junior totals				12	0	1	1	16
Senior totals				7	0	0	0	2
