= CBOYSTV =

American YouTube personality

CboysTV

YouTube information
- Channel: CboysTV
- Years active: 2016–present
- Genres: Motorsports, comedy
- Views: billion
- Last updated: January 25, 2026
- Website: www.cboystv.com

Life Wide Open with CboysTV
- Genre: Talk
- Format: Audio; video
- Language: English

Cast and voices
- Hosted by: CboysTV

Production
- Length: 1–2+ hours

Technical specifications
- Video format: YouTube; Spotify; Apple
- Audio format: MP3

Publication
- No. of episodes: 159 (as of March 6, 2025)
- Original release: July 13, 2021

CboysTV is an American motorsports and comedy YouTube group headquartered in Cormorant, Minnesota. The group consists of CJ Lotzer, Ben Roth, Ryan Iwerks, Grant (Big Ken) Matthees, Micah Sandman, Evan Sheff, Dalton Songstad

This group of YouTubers have made many achievements over the last few years including, hitting 5 million subscribers on the platform. They specialize in motorsports such as motocross, snowcross, drifting, drag racing and many more. They have a large collection of vehicles including dirtbikes, four-wheelers, three-wheelers, trucks, snowmobiles, luxury cars & much more. The group also runs their merch company under the same name and slogan "Life Wide Open" with a wide variety of custom branded high end products. In December of 2025, they launched their premium gear brand "LWO Gear" under the Life Wide Open brand line.

== Description ==
The "C" in CBoys stands for "Cormorant" and the groups motto is "Life Wide Open" The first video posted on the CboysTV YouTube channel was titled “Life of a C-boy”. This video is a montage of the group hanging out, mostly consisting of outdoor content. In 2021 the Group passed 1 million subscribers on YouTube. The group is located in the small lake town of Cormorant, Minnesota. Duke, a 9-year-old Great Pyrenees dog was elected mayor of the town in 2016 with national recognition. Duke is shown on the outro card of every CboysTV video as a nod to their roots.

=== Live events ===
As the channel's media footprint expanded, the group transitioned into organizing large-scale public automotive and motorsports events:

- Octane Autofest: The group collaborates with professional drift racer Chris Forsberg and Brainerd International Raceway (BIR) to host the annual Octane Autofest. The multi-day motorsports festival features professional drifting exhibitions, open mud pits, watercross, autocross racing, and an official CBoysTV-curated car show and open burnout competition.
- Sno Barons Hay Days: The group makes highly publicized annual community appearances at the Sno Barons Hay Days event in North Branch, Minnesota, which is widely recognized as the world's largest snowmobile and powersports festival. The group utilizes the festival to showcase their viral custom project builds, host mass fan meet-and-greets, and retail apparel through their "Wide Open Gear" clothing brand line.

== Legal issues ==
The CBoys ran into legal trouble in 2019 when they jumped a jet ski from one body of water to another, and again when they were drifting and racing on a lake near Cormorant. The lake incident resulted from a DNR officer seeing a post on the CBoys Instagram account showing the activity. The officer issued a reckless driving ticket. The Minnesota DNR issued two citations, the equivalent of traffic tickets, to Micah Sandman.

=== Content and notable accidents ===
Due to the high-risk nature of their extreme motorsports videos and stunts, members of the channel and recurring guests have suffered severe injuries requiring emergency medical treatment during filming:

- Ken Matthees (September 2022): Grant "Big Ken" Matthees fractured his C7 vertebrae during a side-by-side (SxS) vehicle rollover accident. The accident resulted in an emergency hospital stay and a recovery period wearing a neck brace, which was documented by the group on their main channel and detailed further on their podcast.
- Spenser Wilton (October 2025): Regular channel collaborator Spenser "Spenny" Wilton suffered a severe wrist and hand injury during a filming session. The accident required emergency surgery and a seven-month recovery period involving intensive nerve rehab before he could return to riding on the channel.
- Speed Freeks Mini-Jeep Collision (June 2026): While filming a segment on the CBoysTV custom drift track, Dom from the visiting "Speed Freeks" crew lost control of a highly modified, motor-swapped Barbie mini-jeep and collided into a tree. The high-speed impact caused severe front-end structural intrusion directly into the driver's footwell, narrowly avoiding causing major bone fractures to the operator's legs.

==== Vehicle damage and rebuilds ====
The channel's extreme driving format has resulted in significant damage to personal cars and custom automotive builds during production:

- The Hoonicorn Replica Crash and Rebuild (October 2024–present): While filming on the group's drift track, Ben Roth crashed their twin-turbocharged all-wheel-drive Ford Mustang replica into a tree, resulting in severe chassis damage. Following the crash, the vehicle was transferred to automotive fabricator Robby Layton for a comprehensive custom rebuild project.

== Members ==
In 2020 it was announced that Jake Sherbrooke had left the CBoysTV group to start his own channel. In a video explaining the decision Sherbrooke said that he had left because he felt like he did not have a purpose in the group other than doing dangerous stunts. Sherbrooke wished the group the best and said he was happy for their success. Sherbrooke has gone on to create his own channel amassing 364,000 subscribers as of November 2025. The channel is called "Jake Sherbrooke". As of 2025 there have been crossover videos with Sherbrooke and the CBoysTV. After that a friend of theirs, Evan Sheff, joined the channel.

Current

- CJ Lotzer – (2016–present)
- Ben Roth – (2016–present)
- Ryan Iwerks – (2016–present)
- Grant "ken" Matthees – (2016–present)
- Micah Sandman – (2016–present)
- Evan Sheff – (2022–present)

Former

- Jake Sherbrooke – (2016–2020, although is still present in recent videos)

Additional members

- Spenser "Spenny" Wilton (2024–present)
- Gavin Ehlen (2022–present)
- Brian "Big Wrench" Strawsell (2019–present)
- Gavin Carlson (2021–present)
- Jack Johnson (2026–present)
- Dalton Songstad (2023–present)

== Associated channels ==
- Life Wide Open with CboysTV (Podcast)
- Life Wide Open with CboysTV (Clips)
- Shred Eighty
- Grind Hard Plumbing Co.
- Cleetus McFarland
