= 2016 North Dakota gubernatorial election =

- November 8, 2016
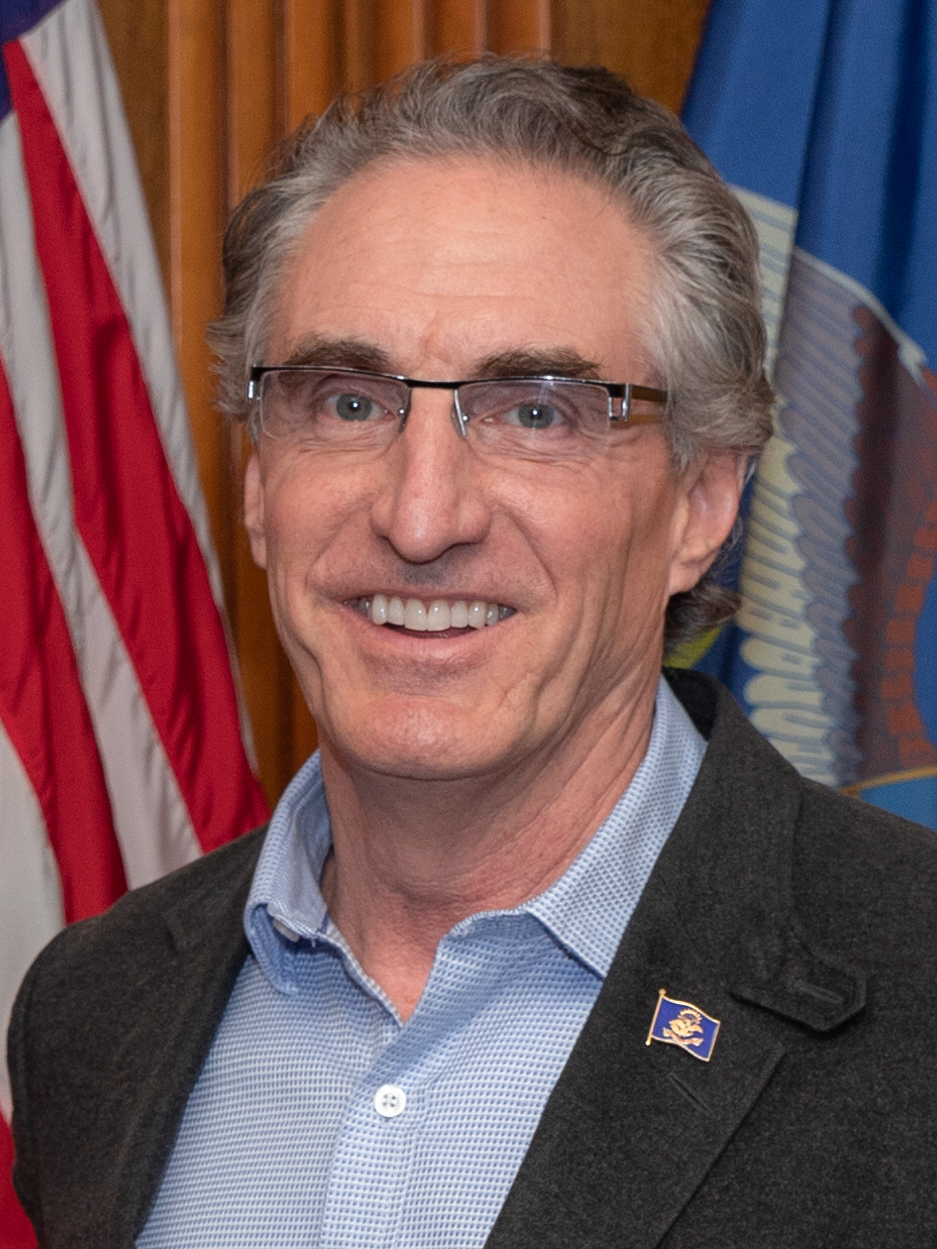

Nominee	Doug Burgum	Marvin Nelson
Party	Republican	Democratic–NPL
Running mate	Brent Sanford	Joan Heckaman
Popular vote	259,863	65,855
Percentage	76.52%	19.39%
- Burgum: 50–60% 60–70% 70–80% 80–90% >90% Nelson: 40–50% 50–60% 60–70% 70–80% 80–90%
Governor before election
Jack Dalrymple
Republican
Elected Governor
Doug Burgum
Republican

The 2016 North Dakota gubernatorial election was held on November 8, 2016, to elect the governor and lieutenant governor of North Dakota, concurrently with the 2016 U.S. presidential election, elections to the United States Senate, elections to the United States House of Representatives, and various state and local elections. This would have been the first time North Dakotans selected a governor under new voter ID requirements, in which a student ID was insufficient identification to vote, but a court ruling in August 2016 struck down the provision; the election was held under the 2013 rules.

The primaries took place on June 14. This is the first open seat election since 2000. Incumbent Republican Jack Dalrymple announced that he would not run for re-election to a second full term in office. Businessman Doug Burgum (R) defeated state Representative Marvin Nelson (DNPL) in the general election to become the new governor of North Dakota.

== Background ==
In December 2010, Republican Governor John Hoeven resigned after being elected to the U.S. Senate. Jack Dalrymple, the lieutenant governor, was sworn in as governor and was elected to a full term in 2012. In August 2015, Dalrymple announced that he would not run for re-election to a second full term in office.

== Republican primary ==
The North Dakota Republican Party endorsed North Dakota Attorney General Wayne Stenehjem at their April 2–3 state convention. However, ballot access was actually determined by the June 14 primary election, which former Microsoft executive Doug Burgum won in an upset.

=== Candidates ===
==== Endorsed ====
- Wayne Stenehjem, North Dakota attorney general
  - Running mate: Nicole Poolman, state senator and wife of Jim Poolman

==== Other candidates ====
- Doug Burgum, former senior vice president of Microsoft and former chairman & CEO of Great Plains Software
  - Running mate: Brent Sanford, Watford City mayor
- Paul Sorum, architect
  - Running mate: Michael Coachman, human resources executive

==== Withdrawn ====
- Rick Becker, state representative

==== Declined ====
- Tom Campbell, state senator
- Kevin Cramer, U.S. representative
- Jack Dalrymple, incumbent governor
- Ed Schafer, former governor and former United States secretary of agriculture
- Kelly Schmidt, North Dakota State Treasurer (running for re-election)
- Drew Wrigley, lieutenant governor

=== Polling ===
Poll source	Date(s) administered	Sample size	Margin of error	Rick Becker	Doug Burgum	Wayne Stenehjem	Undecided
ND United/DFM Research	February 18–25, 2016	369 (Note: likely Republican primary voters)	±5.1%	—	10%	59%	31%

=== Republican State Convention ===
To endorse a candidate, delegates to the Republican state convention voted for one candidate in a series of rounds. After the first round, all candidates would remain on the ballot, but after subsequent rounds of voting, the recipient of the lowest number of votes would be removed. The first candidate to receive more than half the cast vote would receive the state party endorsement.

After no candidate received the majority in the first round, a second round of voting was completed, in which enough delegates voted for Attorney General Wayne Stenehjem to give him the endorsement without having to remove a candidate from the ballot or vote again.

First convention ballot
Party	Candidate	Votes	%
Republican	Wayne Stenehjem	769	47.97%
Republican	Rick Becker	587	36.61%
Republican	Doug Burgum	247	15.40%
Total votes		1,603	100.00%

Second convention ballot
Party	Candidate	Votes	%
Republican	Wayne Stenehjem	823	51.50%
Republican	Rick Becker	618	38.67%
Republican	Doug Burgum	157	9.82%
Total votes		1,598	100.00%

=== Republican primary results ===
Results by county: Burgum—70–80% Burgum—60–70% Burgum—50–60% Burgum—40–50% Burgum/Stenehjem tie—40–50% Stenehjem—50–60%

Republican primary results
Party	Candidate	Votes	%
Republican	Doug Burgum	68,042	59.47%
Republican	Wayne Stenehjem	44,158	38.59%
Republican	Paul Sorum	2,164	1.89%
Republican	Write-in	51	0.04%
Total votes		114,415	100.00%

== Democratic primary ==
=== Candidates ===
==== Endorsed ====
- Marvin Nelson, state representative
  - Running mate: Joan Heckaman, state senator

==== Declined ====
- Ellen Chaffee, nominee for lieutenant governor in 2012
- Heidi Heitkamp, U.S. senator and nominee for governor in 2000
- Tim Mathern, state senator and nominee for governor in 2008
- Tracy Potter, former state senator, nominee for U.S. Senate in 2010 and nominee for superintendent of public instruction in 2012
- George B. Sinner, state senator and nominee for North Dakota's at-large congressional district in 2014
- Ryan Taylor, USDA Rural Development state director, former state senator, nominee for governor in 2012 and nominee for agriculture commissioner in 2014
- Sarah Vogel, former North Dakota agriculture commissioner and candidate for the North Dakota Supreme Court in 1996

=== Results ===
Democratic-NPL primary results
Party	Candidate	Votes	%
Democratic–NPL	Marvin Nelson	17,278	99.66%
Democratic–NPL	Write-in	59	0.34%
Total votes		17,337	100.00%

== Libertarian Party ==
=== Candidates ===
==== Endorsed ====
- Marty Riske, businessman and former state party chairman
  - Running mate: Joshua Voytek

=== Results ===
Libertarian primary results
Party	Candidate	Votes	%
Libertarian	Marty Riske	1,088	99.36%
Libertarian	Write-in	7	0.64%
Total votes		1,095	100.00%

== General election ==
=== Debates ===
- Complete video of debate, October 10, 2016 - C-SPAN

=== Predictions ===
Source	Ranking	As of
The Cook Political Report	Safe R	August 12, 2016
Daily Kos	Safe R	November 8, 2016
Rothenberg Political Report	Safe R	November 3, 2016
Sabato's Crystal Ball	Safe R	November 7, 2016
Real Clear Politics	Safe R	November 1, 2016
Governing	Safe R	October 27, 2016

=== Polling ===
Poll source	Date(s) administered	Sample size	Margin of error	Doug Burgum (R)	Marvin Nelson (D)	Undecided
SurveyMonkey	November 1–7, 2016	313	± 4.6%	70%	27%	3%
SurveyMonkey	October 31–November 6, 2016	288	± 4.6%	68%	29%	3%
SurveyMonkey	October 28–November 3, 2016	276	± 4.6%	70%	27%	3%
SurveyMonkey	October 27–November 2, 2016	260	± 4.6%	69%	28%	3%
SurveyMonkey	October 26–November 1, 2016	254	± 4.6%	67%	30%	3%
SurveyMonkey	October 25–31, 2016	279	± 4.6%	68%	29%	3%

=== Results ===
North Dakota gubernatorial election, 2016
Party	Candidate	Votes	%	±%
Republican	Doug Burgum; Brent Sanford	259,863	76.52	▲13.42
Democratic–NPL	Marvin Nelson; Joan Heckaman	65,855	19.39	▼14.92
Libertarian	Marty Riske; Joshua Voytek	13,230	3.90	N/A
Write-in		653	0.19	▲0.11
Majority		194,008	57.13	▲28.35
Total votes		339,601	100.00	
Republican hold				

==== Counties that flipped from Democratic to Republican ====
- Benson (largest city: Fort Totten)
- McHenry (largest city: Velva)
- Pierce (largest city: Rugby)
- Ransom (largest city: Lisbon)

== See also ==
- United States gubernatorial elections, 2016
