= Marvin Nelson =

American politician

Member of the North Dakota House of Representatives from the 9th district
- In office December 1, 2010 – December 1, 2022
- Preceded by: Scot Kelsh
- Succeeded by: Donna Henderson

Personal details
- Born: June 1, 1958 (age 68) Rugby, North Dakota, U.S.
- Party: Democratic
- Education: Dakota College; North Dakota State University (BS)

Marvin Nelson (born June 1, 1958) is an American politician from the state of North Dakota. He served in the North Dakota House of Representatives as a member of the North Dakota Democratic-Nonpartisan League Party.

Nelson has served in the North Dakota House for the 9th district from 2010-2022. He was a candidate for Governor of North Dakota in the 2016 gubernatorial election. Joan Heckaman was the Lt. Governor candidate on the ticket. Nelson lost to Doug Burgum in the general election.

== Biography ==
=== Early life and education ===
Nelson was born on June 4, 1958, in the small town of Rugby, North Dakota, and raised by his parents, Marlowe and Marion, on a diversified farm northeast of Rugby. Crops on the farm included wheat, barley, oats, flax, and corn; and livestock consisted of dairy cattle, beef cattle, hogs, mink, and chickens. Along with his brother, Mark, and sister, MariJean, the family attended Bethany Lutheran Church in Rugby. Nelson's father served as a township treasurer and County Commissioner in Pierce County. Nelson's parents were also both active in Civil Defense.

Nelson graduated from Rugby High School, where he played French horn in the band and was active in debate and Future Farmers of America. He attended NDSU-BBIF and transferred to North Dakota State University, where he earned a Bachelor of Science in Entomology. During college, Nelson worked during the summer as an apiary inspector for the Department of Agriculture. He attended graduate school at NDSU before becoming a crop consultant.

=== Career ===
Nelson met his wife, Susan Ulwelling, in Fargo, North Dakota. After being married, the two moved to Rolla, North Dakota, where Nelson and several others built a consignment shop called Clothing Connection. Nelson continues to operate the shop, in addition to working as an agricultural consultant.

Nelson serves on the board of directors for the Church of the Lutheran Brethren of America. He has been active in both Farmers Union and Farm Bureau, the Agricultural Consultants of North Dakota, Northwest Landowners Association, and the Salted Lands Council.

=== Political career ===
Nelson was elected to District 9 in the North Dakota House of Representatives in 2010 and was reelected in 2014. District 9 consists of Rolette County. Nelson has served three sessions on the Industry, Business and Labor Committee, and on the Natural Resources, Agriculture, Transportation, and Audit and Fiscal Review Committee. During the Interim, he has served on the Health Care Reform, Taxation, Health Services, Water Topics, and Tribal and State Relations Committees. He currently serves as chairman for Tribal and State Relations.

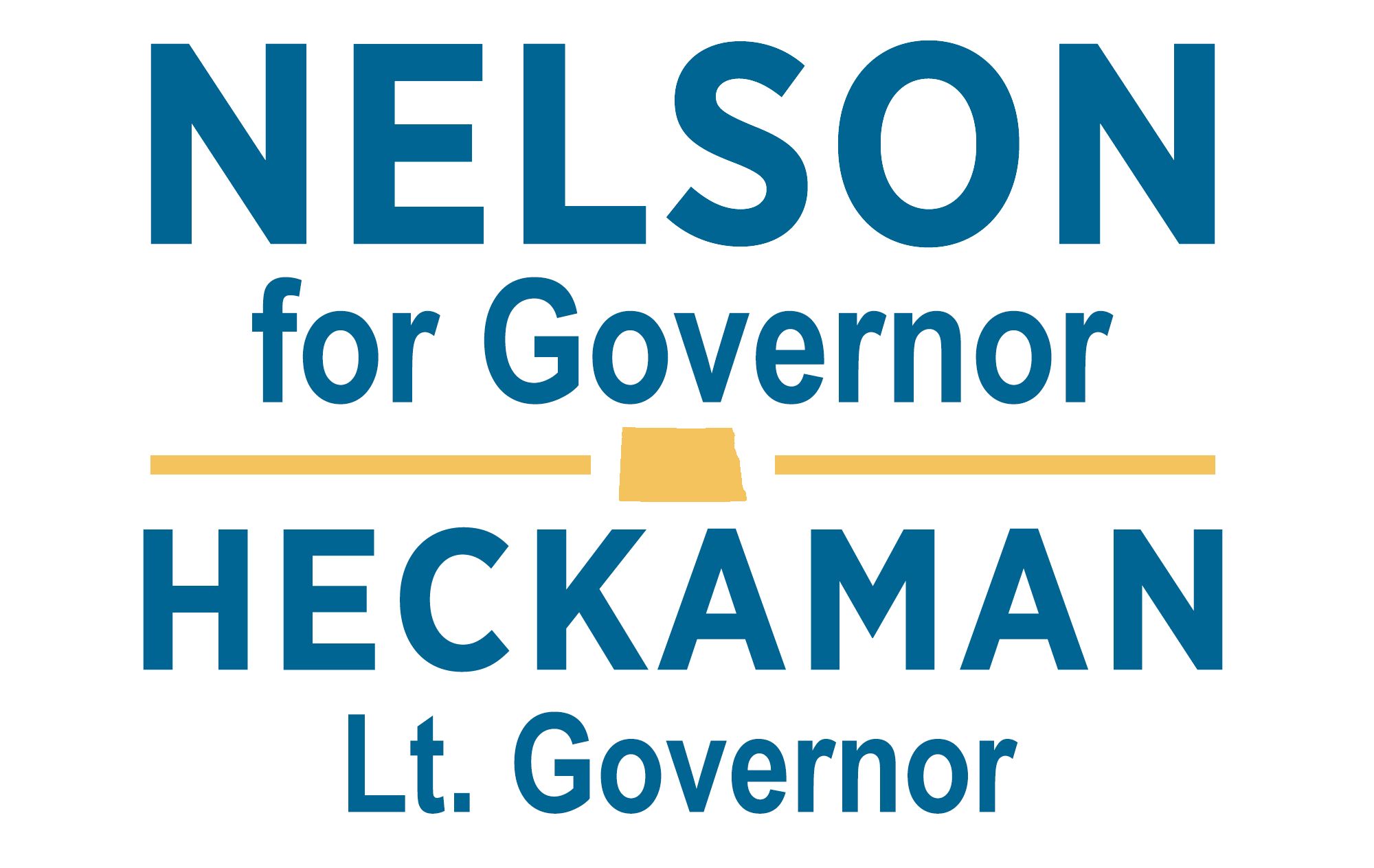
Gubernatorial campaign logo

Nelson has been elected to Legislative Management for two sessions, and also serves on the House Rules Committee. He has been appointed to the Crop Protection Product Harmonization and Registration Board.

=== Candidacy for Governor ===
On March 16, 2016, Nelson launched his campaign to become the Governor of North Dakota. Nelson ran unopposed during the primary and became the nominee of the Democratic-Nonpartisan League. Nelson faced the Republican nominee, Doug Burgum, in the North Dakota gubernatorial election. Nelson was defeated by Burgum on November 8.

Party political offices
Preceded by Ryan Taylor	Democratic nominee for Governor of North Dakota; 2016	Succeeded by Shelley Lenz
