= The Blenders =

Vocal quartet

- Origin: Fargo, North Dakota, U.S.
- Genres: A cappella, Christmas music
- Years active: 1992–present
- Members: Tim Kasper; Ryan Lance; Darren Rust; Allen Rust
- Past members: Paul Dunkirk

The Blenders is a vocal quartet based in Minneapolis, Minnesota (not to be confused with the 1960s vocal quartet of the same name that appeared on the Lawrence Welk Show for two years, and disbanded in 1967, or the R&B group of the same name that recorded between 1949 and 1954).

== History ==
Originally from Fargo, North Dakota, the four members of the Blenders, Tim Kasper, Ryan Lance, Darren Rust and Allan Rust (replacing original member Paul Dunkirk), built up their fan base on the strength of a primarily a cappella singing style. Although their music in later years has included instrument-backed recordings, there has always been a focus on the Blenders' own style of vocal-based harmonies. The group has toured the U.S. with such acts as Jay Leno, Howie Mandel, Savage Garden, Jonny Lang, Blues Traveler, Chicago, The Righteous Brothers, Lou Rawls and Chuck Berry. They have appeared on a variety of national and regional television shows, including The Arsenio Hall Show, The Today Show and Crook & Chase. Their music has been used for films such as The Perfect Holiday and Nothing like the Holidays. Their albums usually include some of their own original songs, plus covers of music that ranges from standards to decidedly non-traditional fare. They have recorded for four different labels: Cowtown Records, Primarily A Cappella, Orchard Lane Records (A former division of the Musicland Group) and Universal Records. Their release for Orchard Lane was co-produced by former member of Prince (musician)'s New Power Generation, Levi Seacer, Jr.

The Blenders spent their early years, beginning in the '90s, touring hundreds of colleges and universities across the country. They received the Contemporary Artist of the Year award in 1994 and 1995 by the National Association for Campus Activities.

In 1997 The Blenders signed with Universal Records and released Loveland. The album's single releases were a mild success on radio in pockets around the US, but they found international success with a number one hit in a handful of European countries with a remake of Dean Friedman's quirky song, "(I am in Love With the) McDonald's Girl."

The Blenders have become known for their Christmas music, and have been staging a Christmas Tour in theaters (mostly in the Midwest) since 1997. Occasionally they will perform in other cities where they have achieved great popularity such as Dallas, Chicago, Memphis, New York, Los Angeles and Salt Lake City.

The Blenders have performed on Minneapolis–Saint Paul area television commercials. In December 2005, The Blenders sang their original song "Tiny Little Christmas," and the following year repeated with "When it Snows" in an advertisement for KARE-TV promoting Toys for Tots. They also appeared in an ad, singing KMSP-TV's morning news theme song ("Wake Up with FOX 9") while riding a Metro Blue Line light-rail train. Their work with KMSP has won them three Emmy Awards for advertising. They had a McDonald's commercial airing nationwide featuring their version of "McDonald's Girl". They were also featured in a TV commercial for Scheels Sporting Goods that ran 2022-24.

Forum Communications produced “One Last Song,” a documentary about the 30 year career of The Blenders in 2019.

In 2025 the group decided to step away from touring. "After 26 years of doing the Holiday Soul Tour — and 35 years together as a group — the four of us decided we needed time to reset and explore our options." Now located in Minnesota, the group has released 14 albums, including nine Christmas albums. Already members of the Minnesota Music Hall of Fame, they were also recently inducted into the North Dakota Music Hall of Fame.

Founding member Tim Kasper says, although they are not focused on touring right now, they are all still great friends and love making music and performing together. "We are more focused on preserving our legacy these days, and any projects that come along. We relish opportunities to work together and create." Kasper added that they have achieved things beyond their wildest dreams."

== Discography ==
- Totally Whipped (1992)
- From The Mouth (1994)
- The Blenders (1995)
- Nog (1997)
- Now and Then (1997)
- Loveland (1999)
- When it Snows (2002)
- Holiday Best (2004) - compilation from Nog and When it Snows + 1 new song ("I'll be Home for Christmas")
- Most Wonderful Time (2005)
- Songs From the Soul (2006)
- The Blenders: Christmas Collection (2007) - 2 CDs with all of The Blenders' holiday songs
- Christmas with the Blenders: Live in Concert (2007) - DVD
- Songs From the Soul Vol. II (2008)
- "McDonald's Girl" - Single (2011)
- "Christmas Light" (2011)
- "25" (2015)
- "Holy Night" (2017)
- "Christmas with The Blenders (Live Studio Sessions)" - Album (2020)
- "What Christmas Means To Me" - Digital Single (2023)
