= Doug Burgum =

American politician and businessman (born 1956)

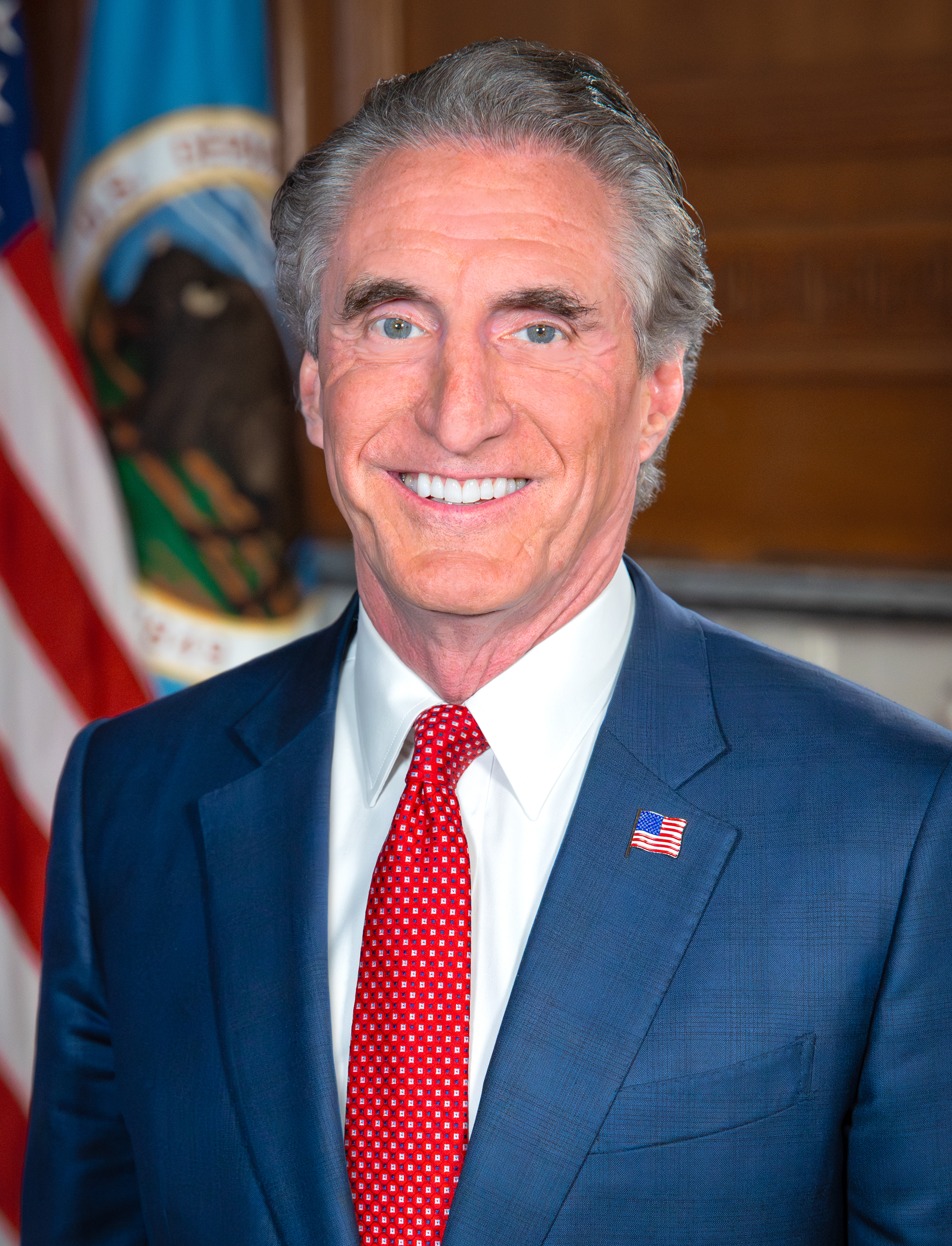
- Official portrait, 2025

55th United States Secretary of the Interior
- Incumbent
- Assumed office February 1, 2025
- President: Donald Trump
- Deputy: Katharine MacGregor
- Preceded by: Deb Haaland

33rd Governor of North Dakota
- In office December 15, 2016 – December 15, 2024
- Lieutenant: Brent Sanford; Tammy Miller
- Preceded by: Jack Dalrymple
- Succeeded by: Kelly Armstrong

Personal details
- Born: Douglas James Burgum; August 1, 1956 (age 70) Arthur, North Dakota, U.S.
- Party: Republican
- Spouses: Karen Stoker (m. 1991; div. 2003); Kathryn Helgaas (m. 2016)
- Children: 3
- Education: North Dakota State University (BA); Stanford University (MBA)

Douglas James Burgum (/ˈbɜːrɡəm/ BURG-əm; born August 1, 1956) is an American businessman and politician who has served as the 55th United States secretary of the interior since 2025 under President Donald Trump. A member of the Republican Party, he previously served as the 33rd governor of North Dakota from 2016 to 2024.

Burgum was born and raised in Arthur, North Dakota. After graduating from North Dakota State University in 1978 with a bachelor's degree in university studies and earning an MBA from Stanford University two years later, he mortgaged inherited farmland in 1983 to invest in Great Plains Software in Fargo. Becoming its president in 1984, he took the company public in 1997. Burgum sold the company to Microsoft for $1.1 billion in 2001. While working at Microsoft, he managed Microsoft Business Solutions. He has served as board chairman for Australian software company Atlassian and SuccessFactors. Burgum is the founder of Kilbourne Group, a Fargo-based real-estate development firm, and also is the co-founder of Arthur Ventures, a software venture capital group.

Burgum won the 2016 North Dakota gubernatorial election in a landslide. He was reelected by a wide margin in 2020. In June 2023, Burgum launched a campaign for the 2024 Republican presidential nomination. He ended his candidacy in early December 2023, and became an advisor on the Trump campaign's energy policy. On November 14, 2024, President-elect Trump announced his intention to nominate Burgum as the United States secretary of the interior. On January 30, 2025, Burgum was confirmed by the U.S. Senate in a 79–18 vote. On February 1, 2025, Burgum was sworn in as the fifty-fifth U.S. secretary of the interior.

As Secretary of the Interior, he oversaw the Trump administration's attack on wind power, while promoting coal-fired power, expanded drilling on federal lands, and expanded metals extraction from federal lands and wildlife refuges. In 2026, Burgum announced that U.S. taxpayers would pay multiple energy companies, including a French company, nearly $2.6 billion to stop plans to build wind farms in the United States.

== Early life ==
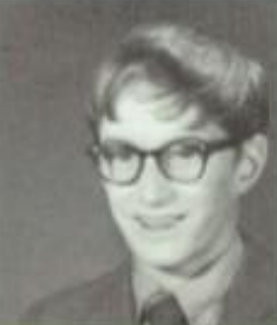
Burgum's 8th grade yearbook photo, 1970.

Burgum was born on August 1, 1956, in Arthur, North Dakota, the son of Katherine (née Kilbourne) and Joseph Boyd Burgum, who were both of English descent. He has a brother, Bradley, and a sister, Barbara. His grandfather J. A. Burgum established a grain elevator in Arthur in 1906. The company evolved into an agribusiness still owned by the family.

During his freshman year in high school, Burgum's father died. He later said that the experience shaped him as a person. He graduated from North Dakota State University (NDSU) in 1978. He was a member of Sigma Alpha Epsilon and served as student body president. As a college student, he started a chimney-sweeping business.

Burgum later studied at the Stanford Graduate School of Business, where he befriended Steve Ballmer, who became CEO of Microsoft. He completed his MBA from Stanford's Graduate School of Business in 1980.

== Business career ==
=== Great Plains Software ===
After earning his MBA, Burgum moved to Chicago to become a management consultant at McKinsey & Company.

In March 1983, Burgum mortgaged $250,000 of farmland to provide the seed capital for accounting software company Great Plains Software in Fargo. He acquired a 2.5% stake in the company, and became its vice president of marketing. In 1984, Burgum led a group of investors, including relatives, who purchased a controlling interest in Great Plains Software from Joseph C. Larson, the company's founder, who retained a minority interest.

During the 1980s, Fortune magazine often ranked Great Plains Software among the nation's top 100 companies to work for. Burgum grew the company to about 250 employees by 1989 and led it to about $300 million in annual sales, after using the internet to help it expand beyond North Dakota. He said he built the company in Fargo because North Dakota State University was there; NDSU acted as a feeder school to supply engineering students to GPS. The company went public in 1997. In 1999 the company acquired Match Data Systems, a development team in the Philippines. In 2001, Burgum sold Great Plains Software to Microsoft for $1.1 billion in stock. Announced in December 2000, the acquisition was completed in 2001. According to Burgum, he held a 10% stake in Great Plains at the time.

=== Microsoft ===
After the sale, Burgum was named senior vice president of Microsoft Business Solutions Group, the unit created from GPS. At Microsoft, he was responsible for making enterprise apps a priority. In 2005, he expressed interest in stepping down as senior vice president to become chairman of Microsoft Business Solutions. In September 2006, he announced that he planned to leave Microsoft entirely by 2007.

=== Investment firms ===
In 2008 Burgum co-founded Arthur Ventures, a venture capital company that invests in businesses involved in technology, life sciences, and clean technologies. The group began operation with a $20 million fund and primarily invested in companies in North Dakota and Minnesota. By 2013 it had expanded operations into Nebraska, Missouri, Arizona, and Iowa.

Burgum is also the founder of the Kilbourne Group, a real-estate development firm focused on downtown Fargo. In 2013 he created plans to build the tallest building in Fargo—a 23-story mixed-use building—to be named either Block 9 or Dakota Place. It was completed in 2020 as the RDO Building. The company advocated for a convention center to be built in downtown Fargo. It acquired and renovated many Fargo properties, including the former St. Mark's Lutheran Church and the former Woodrow Wilson alternative high school. Several of the companies he has invested in are in Fargo.

In 2009, he was "urged to apply" for the position of president of North Dakota State University, but in 2010 he was passed over for Dean Bresciani.

== Governor of North Dakota (2016–2024) ==
Prior to running for office, Burgum endorsed Republican Steve Sydness for one of North Dakota's U.S. Senate seats in 1988. He supported the gubernatorial campaigns of Republicans John Hoeven and Jack Dalrymple in 2008 and 2012.

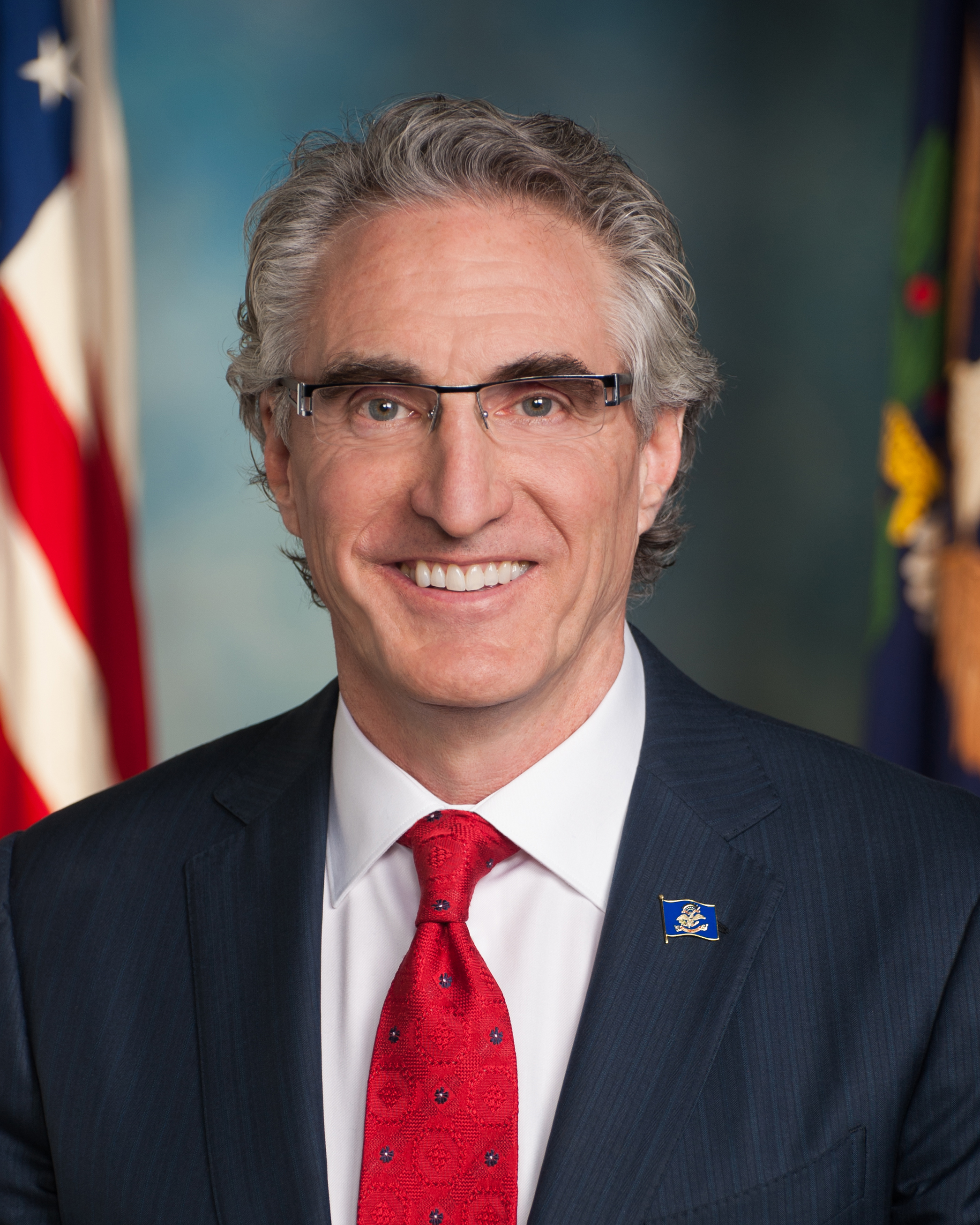
Burgum during his tenure as governor, December 2016

=== Elections ===
==== 2016 ====
In 2016, Burgum announced his candidacy for governor of North Dakota as a Republican. With no formal political experience, he lost the state Republican party's endorsement to longtime attorney general Wayne Stenehjem, but defeated Stenehjem handily in the primary election two months later. Burgum faced Democrat Marvin Nelson and Libertarian Marty Riske in the November general election and won with over 75% of the vote. He was sworn in on December 15, 2016, alongside running mate Brent Sanford.

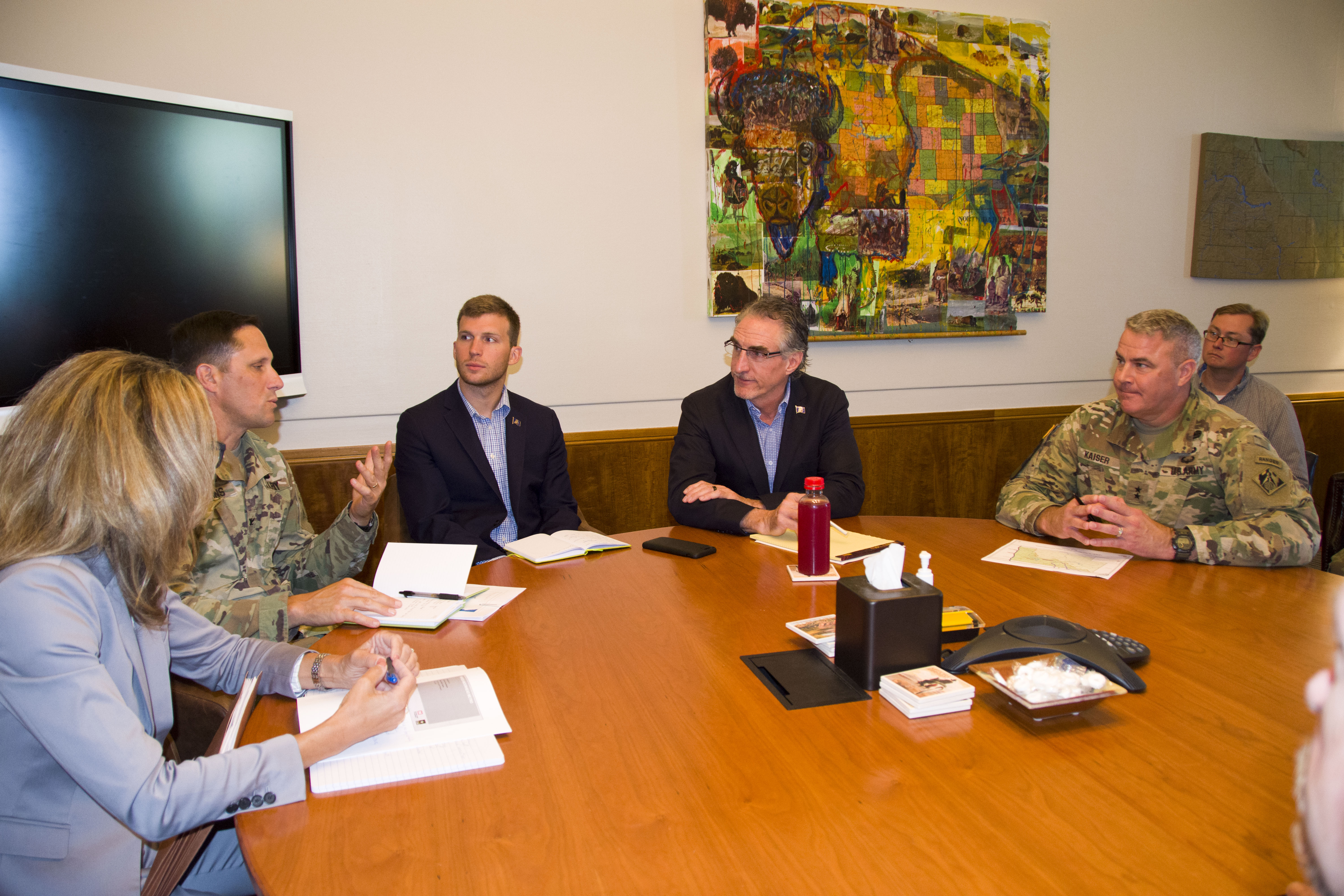
Burgum meets with the commanding general of the Mississippi Valley Division of the United States Army Corps of Engineers in June 2018.

==== 2020 ====
Burgum was reelected in 2020 with over 65% of the vote.

=== Tenure ===
During both terms, North Dakota maintained a robust fossil fuel industry. Burgum set a goal for North Dakota to become carbon-neutral by 2030, which he planned to accomplish through carbon capture and storage technology to capture and sequester carbon dioxide in the state's geological formations and by using carbon dioxide for enhanced oil recovery and via agricultural practices that sequester carbon in soil. At the annual meeting of the North Dakota petroleum council in 2021, Burgum claimed that announcement of the goal sparked $25 billion in private sector investment.

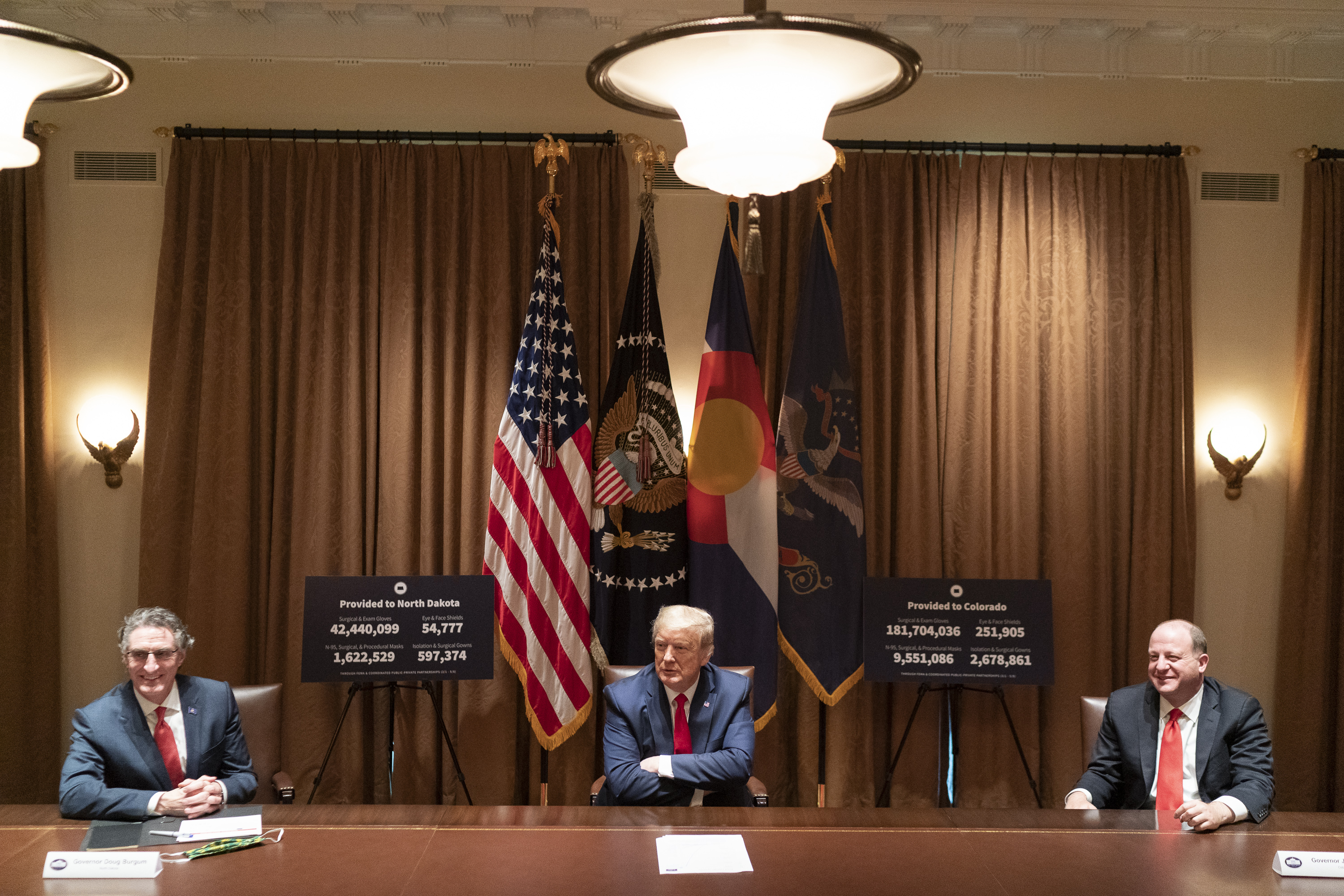
Burgum with President Donald Trump and Jared Polis in May 2020

On December 20, 2022, Sanford resigned, citing a desire to return to the private sector. Burgum appointed businesswoman Tammy Miller as lieutenant governor. She took office on January 2, 2023.

Since taking office, Burgum has presented the Rough Rider Award, North Dakota's highest civilian award, numerous times. Those chosen have included Virgil Hill, Steve D. Scheel, and Clint Hill.

In January 2023, Burgum and other North Dakota officials threatened to sue Minnesota over a law that would require the state's electricity to be powered by carbon-free energy by 2040. Minnesota governor Tim Walz signed the bill on February 7, 2023.

In an attempt to mitigate the schoolteacher shortage, Burgum announced the creation of a Teacher Retention and Recruitment task force that would consist of multiple members, Burgum, and the North Dakota Superintendent of Public Instruction.

In October 2023, Burgum condemned Hamas and noted that 84 North Dakotans who were on a church tour were stranded in Bethlehem as the fighting began.

On March 20, 2023, Burgum vetoed a bill to raise the state interstate speed limit to 80 mph.

During the 2023 legislative session, he signed a bill that exempts members of the North Dakota National Guard and reserve from paying income tax, and another that provided over $500 million in tax relief.

On October 22, 2023, a special session of the North Dakota Legislative Assembly was called after the North Dakota Supreme Court struck down the state's budget as unconstitutional, stating that the general budget did not meet North Dakota's constitution's single-subject requirement for bills. Burgum had to be present in Bismarck to approve the 14 separate budget bills that the legislature seeks to pass to recreate the initial budget. Burgum stated he expected to return to his presidential campaign within a week of the session being called; however, the special session resolved the budget and was closed in just three days.

On January 22, 2024, Burgum announced that he would not run for a third term as governor. On February 21, he endorsed Lieutenant Governor Tammy Miller to succeed him. Miller lost the primary to U.S. representative Kelly Armstrong, who won the general election.

== 2024 presidential campaign ==
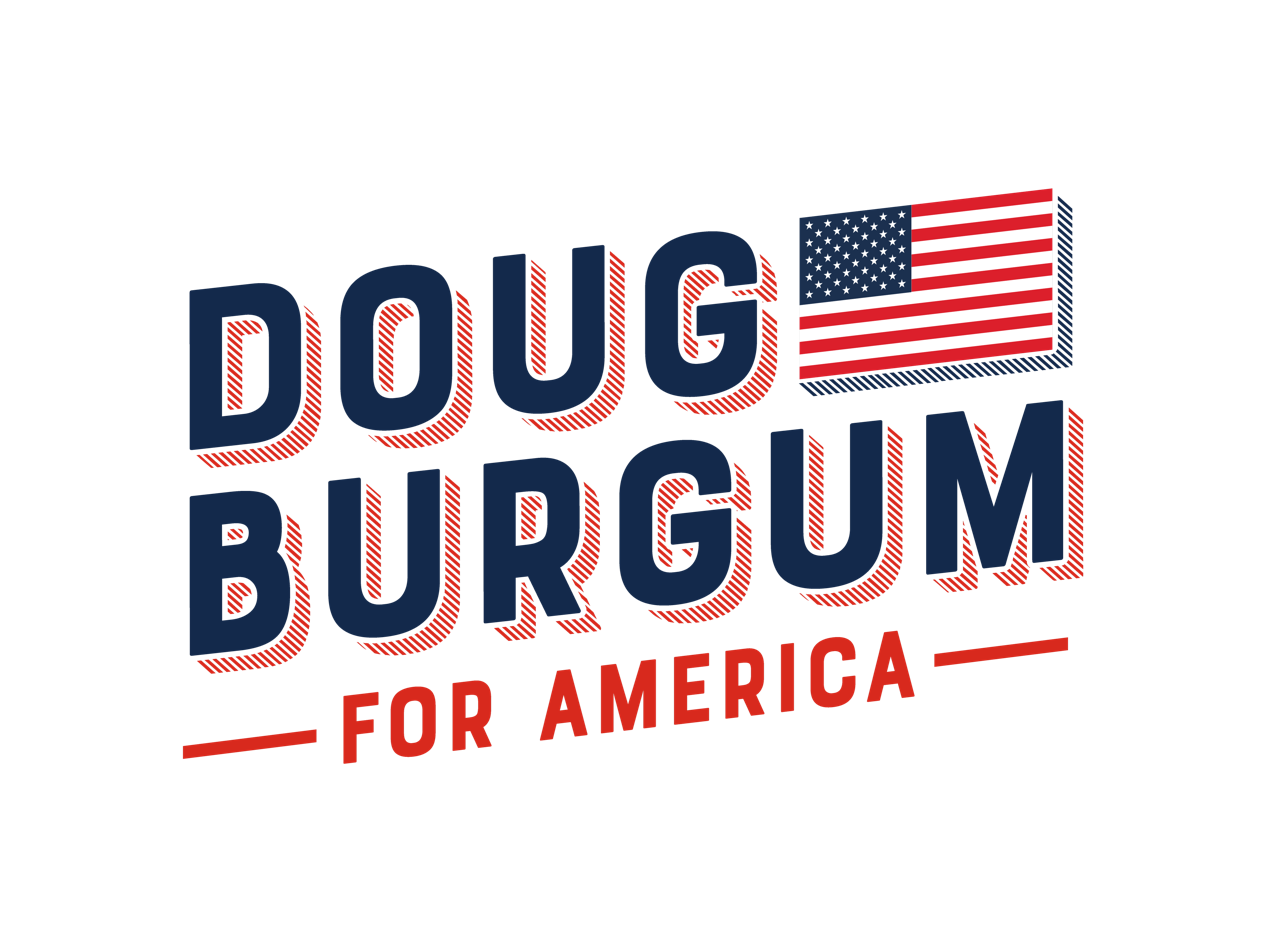
Burgum's logo for his 2024 Presidential campaign

In March 2023, Burgum expressed interest in running for president in the 2024 United States presidential election. On June 5, 2023, he posted a video to his Twitter account teasing a "big announcement" for June 7. He formally announced his campaign in The Wall Street Journal the morning of June 7, with the launch of a campaign website and a rally in Fargo scheduled to take place later that day. After his announcement, Burgum began campaigning in Iowa.

Burgum was reported to have spent more money on advertisements than any other presidential candidate. He was endorsed by North Dakota's entire Congressional delegation, U.S. senators John Hoeven and Kevin Cramer and U.S. representative Kelly Armstrong. He was also endorsed by actor Josh Duhamel, who also endorsed him in his 2016 campaign.

Burgum expressed support for the U.S. Supreme Court's Dobbs decision. His support derived from his position that abortion restrictions should be left to states. He pledged that as president he would not sign a national abortion ban and that the president should not focus on culture war issues. According to Politico, Burgum sought to play up his stance as a China hawk by speaking of a cold war with China. On July 10, 2023, he began offering $20 gift cards for a donation of any amount to his primary campaign. A spokesman for Burgum acknowledged that it was an attempt to reach the threshold of individual donors required to participate in the first Republican primary debate. The promotion was successful. Despite its success, he was ridiculed on social media, with some users declaring that they had donated $1 to Burgum and $20 to Joe Biden's reelection campaign. Federal election officials have not said whether this and similar moves by other candidates is illegal. Burgum also qualified for the second debate, held on September 27. He failed to qualify for the November 5, 2023 debate in Miami.

On December 4, 2023, Burgum announced that he was suspending his campaign, citing frustration with the RNC's high threshold of donations and polling to qualify for debates.

=== Vice-presidential speculation ===
During his campaign, Burgum said he would not accept the vice presidency or a cabinet position if he was not nominated for president, so he was widely expected at the time to seek a third term as governor in the 2024 North Dakota gubernatorial election. On January 22, 2024, he announced he would not do so.

Before the Iowa caucuses, Burgum endorsed former president Donald Trump. Afterward, he began campaigning for Trump, who praised Burgum and said he wanted him to be an important member of his next administration. Later, Trump said Burgum would be "very good" as vice president, but reiterated that he had not yet made a decision. Burgum spoke on behalf of Trump at the North Dakota caucuses. Trump ally and U.S. senator Kevin Cramer said Burgum would be a clear front-runner for a cabinet position, most likely secretary of energy. Later during the primary season, Burgum was reportedly high on Trump's VP shortlist, and on May 2, Trump announced that Burgum was one of four remaining contenders, alongside senators Marco Rubio, Tim Scott, and JD Vance.

During the Republican National Convention, Burgum was reported to have not been selected as Trump's running mate. According to campaign insiders, Trump was leaning toward Burgum, but his sons Donald Jr. and Eric persuaded him to choose Vance.

Burgum served as the Trump 2024 campaign's main advisor on energy policy. Axios reported that the Trump campaign had sent him as a surrogate to campaign events more than anyone else on Trump's shortlist for running mate.

== Secretary of the Interior (2025–present) ==
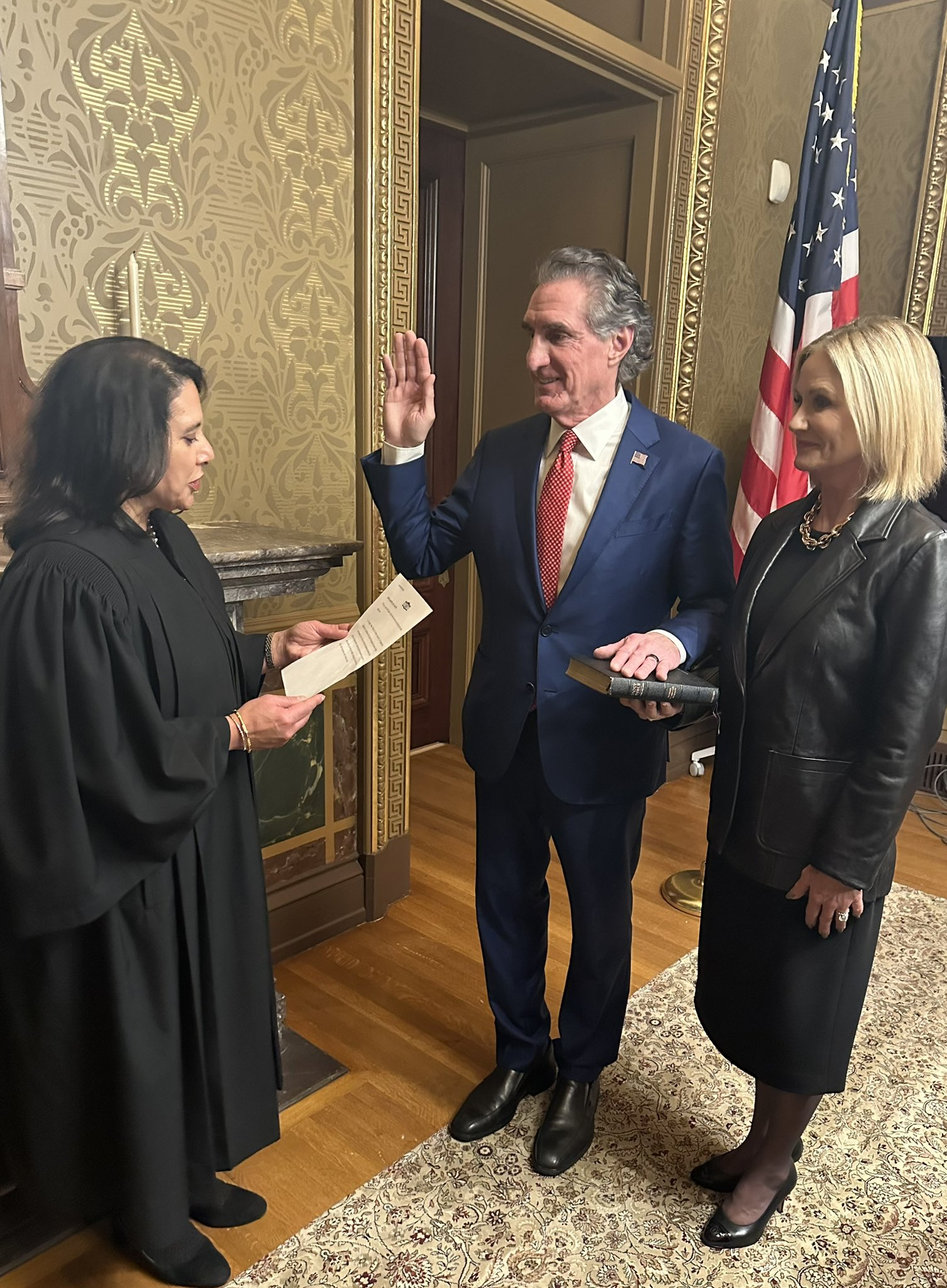
Burgum being sworn in on February 1, 2025

=== Nomination and confirmation ===
On November 15, 2024, President-elect Donald Trump announced his nomination of Burgum for Secretary of the Interior in the second Trump administration. The Department of the Interior oversees public lands, natural resources, and the Bureau of Indian Affairs, among other things.

Trump also named Burgum as his new "energy czar" to handle deregulation and private investments. This position also gives Burgum a seat on the National Security Council.

Burgum's selection was highly praised by numerous Republican senators, including John Barrasso, Dan Sullivan, and Tim Sheehy. Many tribal leaders also expressed support for his nomination. It received backlash from environmental groups over Burgum's ties to and plans for the fossil fuel industry, such as his support for the pro-coal Lignite Energy Council.

Before the Energy and Natural Resources Committee, Burgum stated that he viewed America's public lands and waters as part of the country's financial "balance sheet", and advocated for extracting potentially trillions of dollars' worth of oil, gas and minerals via mining and drilling. He also stated that he intended to realize Trump's plan for energy independence via "energy dominance" and an expansion of America's fossil fuel production. He also argued that curbs on energy production posed a national security threat as it means the United States has to import fuel from other countries, such as Russia and Iran. He also said "I believe that climate change is a global phenomenon, for sure."

On January 23, 2025, the Senate Energy and Natural Resources Committee approved Burgum's nomination in a 18–2 vote. (Note: The two votes in opposition were Democratic Senators Ron Wyden of Oregon and Mazie Hirono of Hawaii.) On January 30, 2025, Burgum was confirmed by the U.S. Senate in a 79–18 vote, receiving the second most bipartisan support of any cabinet member after Secretary of State Marco Rubio.

=== Tenure ===
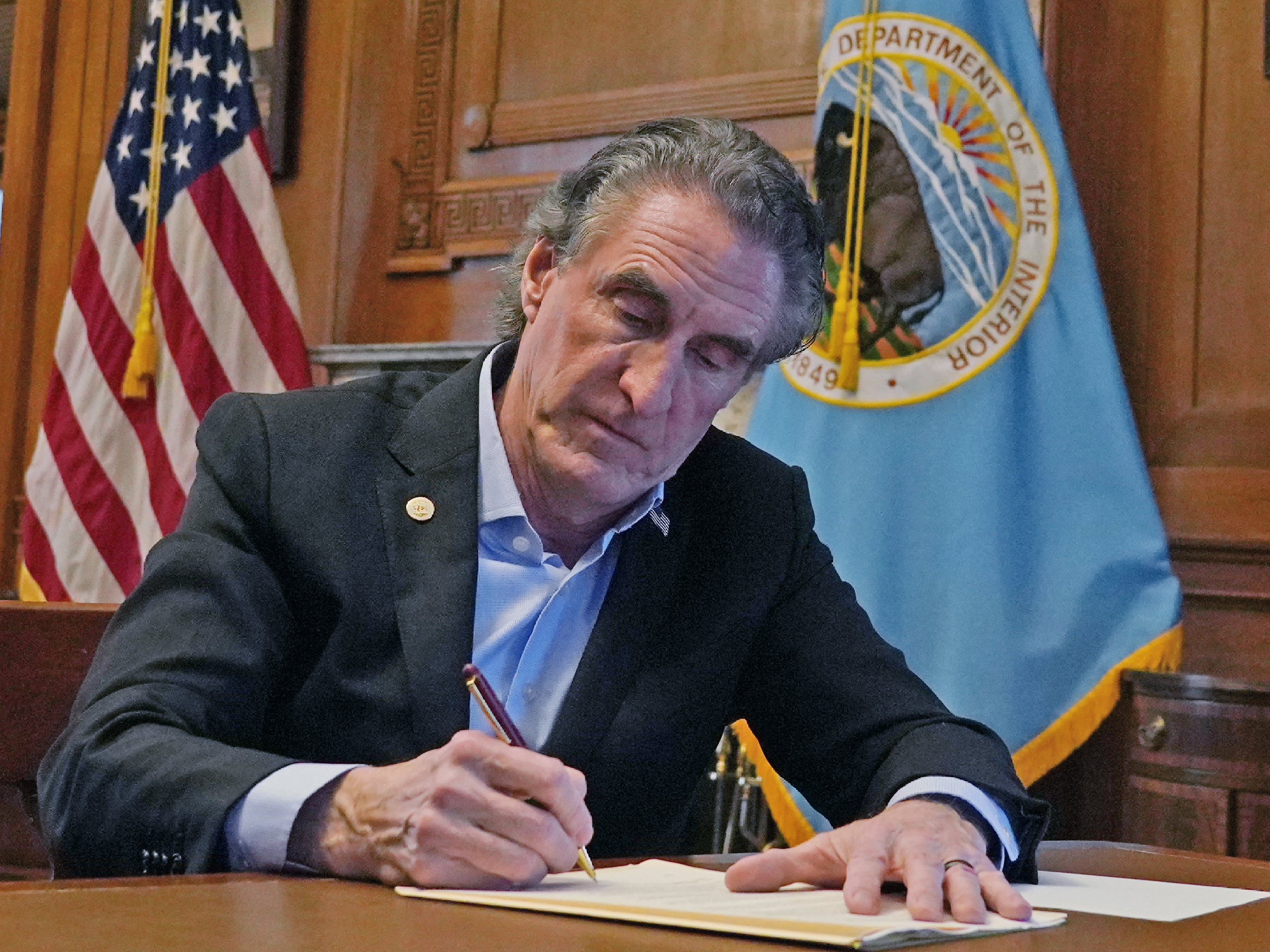
Burgum signing his first order as secretary of the interior on February 3, 2025

On February 1, 2025, Burgum was sworn in as the fifty-fifth United States secretary of the interior. Burgum's first act was sending a department-wide email calling for reduced regulation and the expansion of natural resource extraction. To this end, Burgum signed a suite of orders to speed project development and permitting and to eliminate regulations from the Inflation Reduction Act. Andrea Travnicek, a North Dakotan who worked in Burgum's gubernatorial cabinet and in the Senate Energy and Natural Resources Committee, was nominated by Trump as assistant secretary of the Interior.

Burgum was praised by several tribal leaders, including from the Cherokee and Caddo nations, for exempting tribal nations from Trump's restrictions on diversity, equity, and inclusion programs, consistent with treaty obligations.

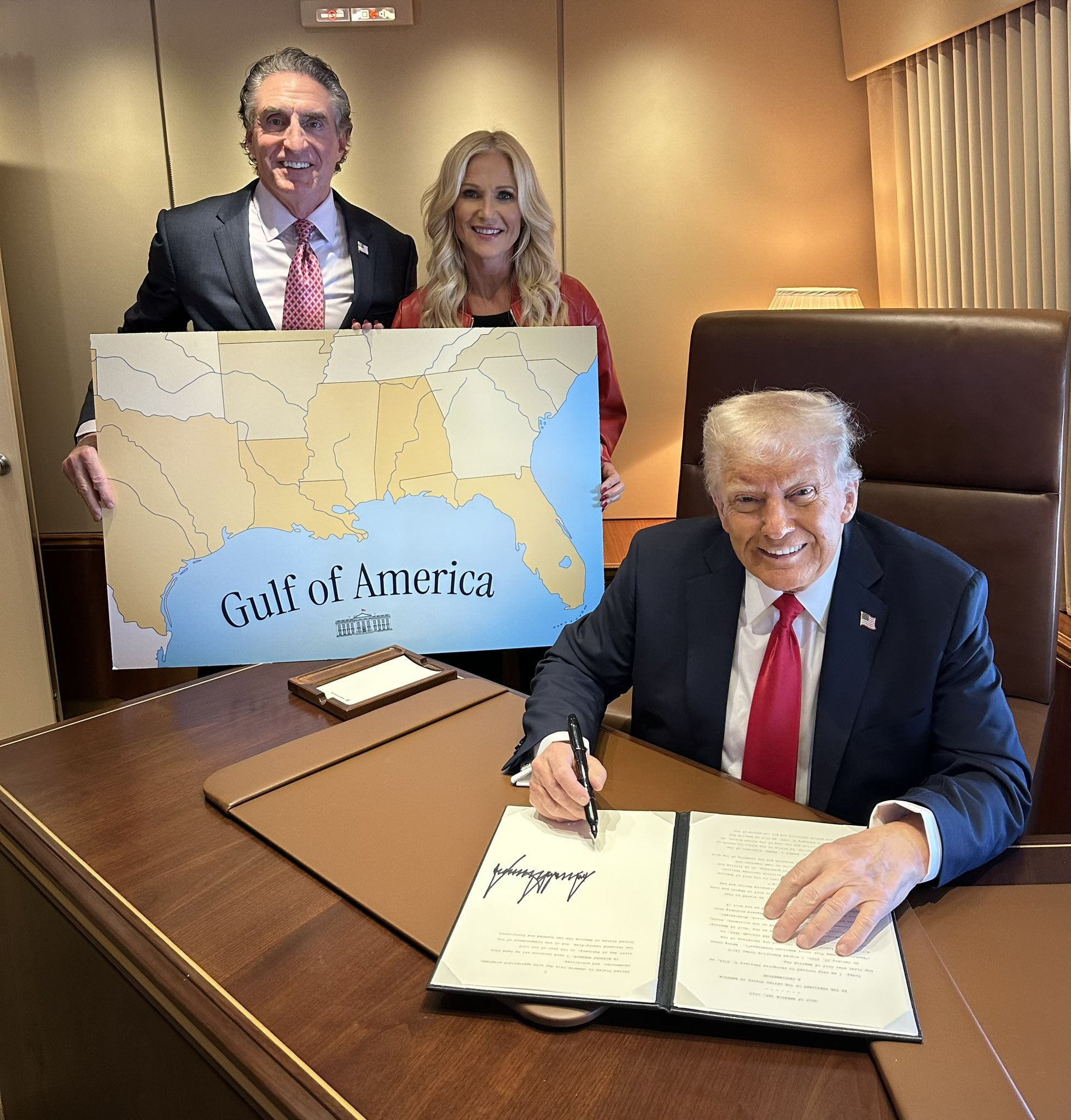
Burgum on board Air Force One with President Donald Trump signing a proclamation declaring February 9 "Gulf of America Day", 2025

Burgum was also tapped to lead Trump's efforts to rename the Gulf of Mexico as the "Gulf of America", which included his department contacting mapping companies like Google Maps.

On February 18, 2025, Trump announced that Burgum, as interior secretary, would lead his "National Energy Dominance Council" with Secretary of Energy Chris Wright as vice-chairman. Shortly after, Burgum was also confirmed as a speaker at the 2025 Conservative Political Action Conference.

Later in March, Burgum suggested that Trump should use emergency authority under a "national energy emergency" to keep as many coal plants open as possible and that "if there had been units at a coal plant that have been shut down, we need to bring those back". He also stated that more energy production could be achieved through drilling on federal lands. Burgum later announced the department was partnering with the Department of Housing and Urban Development and its secretary Scott Turner to use public lands to build more affordable housing in the country.

In late March, Burgum announced the department would open up 1.53 million acres of the Alaskan Arctic National Wildlife Refuge to oil drilling in accordance with Trump's executive order to allow more energy production in the state.

In April, Burgum ordered a halt to a $5 billion offshore wind energy project by Equinor off the coast of New York City. This was part of a larger effort by the second Trump administration to stop offshore wind projects. The halt is currently being challenged in court by multiple democratic state attorneys general, and a dismissal of the case was rejected by federal judge William G. Young, which has allowed Equinor to continue regardless of the order. In December 2025, Burgum announced that the Trump administration would halt leases for five offshore wind projects on the East Coast, citing unspecified national security concerns. In March 2026, Burgum announced that U.S. taxpayers would pay the French energy company Total $1 billion to abandon its plans to build wind farms, with Burgum saying that wind power was ineffective.

On May 15, 2025, Burgum completed his disclosures and divestitures, which included numerous pieces of farmland in both North Dakota and Minnesota stating that he would "receive only rent or royalties pursuant to the crop share agreement." He also resigned as managing partner from his agronomy startup Arthur Ventures and from his position on the board of the Kilbourne Group, a real estate company.

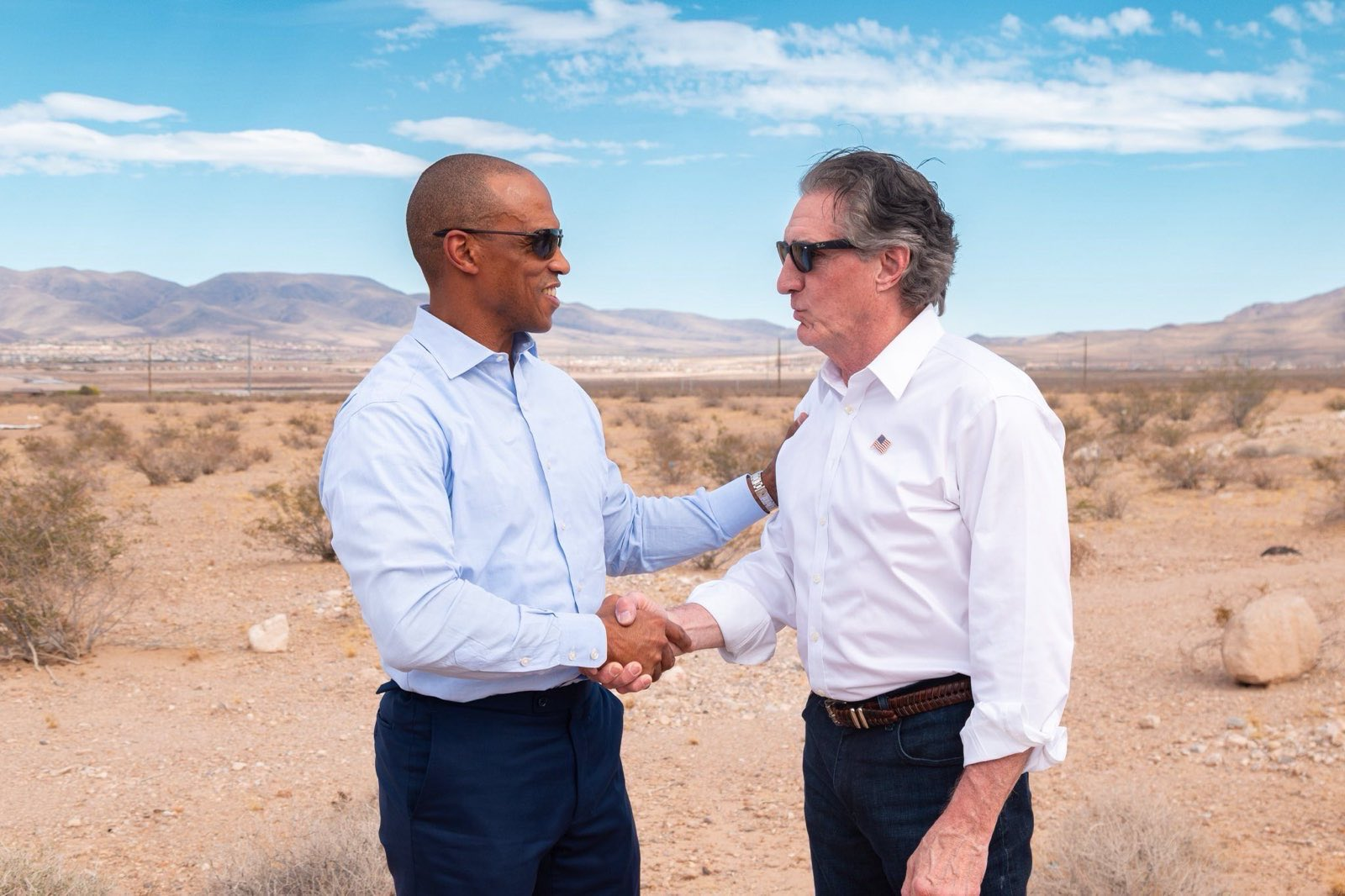
Burgum with HUD secretary Scott Turner in Nevada, May 2025

While speaking to the Western Governors Association on June 23, 2025, Burgum did not address the prospect of 250 million acres of Bureau of Land Management and Forest Service land becoming eligible for sale under the proposed "Big Beautiful Bill." Instead he called for expanded rare earth metal and energy extraction in western lands under the administration of the Department of the Interior. A protest was held outside the event by former secretary of the interior Deb Haaland, claiming that Burgum "prioritizes corporate greed over New Mexico's wellbeing." Burgum, in response, stated that he was unaware of the public lands portion and that it "wasn't part of the president's agenda to be part of this bill in the first place." That section of the bill would be removed before being signed by Trump.

Burgum with president Trump in September 2026

Additionally, Burgum's efforts to create a centralized wildfire firefighting force was criticized by New Mexico Governor Michelle Lujan Grisham at the meeting, saying the task was better left to the Forest Service.

On July 17, 2025, Burgum and Attorney General Pam Bondi visited Alcatraz Island and its inactive prison, after Trump commented on reopening the prison in May.

In July 2026, Burgum issued a secretarial order to merge the Bureau of Ocean Energy Management and Bureau of Safety and Environmental Enforcement into the Marine Minerals Administration.

== Political positions ==
During his 2016 campaign he described himself as a moderate on social issues and a fiscal conservative. Burgum was a critic of the Joe Biden administration.

=== Energy and environment ===
Burgum supports the fossil fuel industry, especially in the Bakken region of western North Dakota. He supports the Dakota Access Pipeline. He has said that American energy independence is an issue of national security. He derided what he called a "full-on assault of liquid fuels in this country" and has regularly criticized policies to subsidize electric vehicles. He called for opening Bureau of Land Management land for energy-related activities such as rare earth metal mining and oil and natural gas drilling. He promised to make North Dakota carbon neutral by 2030; he said he would loosen regulations for the gas industry, but also said he is committed to clean energy projects.

Burgum criticized the Biden administration for policies phasing out gas stoves in some forms of new housing.

==== CO2 pipelines ====
Burgum has been a vocal supporter of carbon capture pipelines while governor, going so far as to allow three natural gas companies, Summit Carbon Solutions, Navigator CO_{2} Ventures, and Wolf Carbon Solutions, to use eminent domain to seize land to install pipelines. These pipelines would transport excess carbon dioxide captured from ethanol production plants in Iowa to facilities in North Dakota to store them deep underground. Many rural residents oppose the pipelines due to the fear of leaks as well as the seizure of private land to create them. When confronted about the issue at an Iowa rally, Burgum changed his position, saying he fervently opposed eminent domain, but insisted that carbon capture was good for the economy and the environment and that it would allow the use of traditional internal combustion automobiles indefinitely.

=== Abortion ===
During his 2016 gubernatorial campaign, Burgum was noted for saying women were "unsafe" before Roe v. Wade. In 2024, he said his position on abortion had evolved in that he believes abortion laws should be left to the individual states.

In April 2023, Burgum signed a near-total ban on abortion in North Dakota. While campaigning for president, he said that he would not support a nationwide abortion ban, preferring that individual states set abortion policy. He supported the Supreme Court decision Dobbs v. Jackson Women's Health Organization that overturned Roe v. Wade.

=== Gun rights ===
Burgum received an A grade on gun issues from the NRA Political Victory Fund and signed numerous laws that ease access to firearms. He has touted his love of hunting.

=== Mental health ===
In an interview with ABC News, Burgum's wife, Kathryn, opened up about her history of being suicidal and an alcoholic and said that, if she became First Lady, her top priority would be to find a solution to the "behavior health crisis", to end the stigmatization of mental illness, and to rework mental health insurance. Shortly afterward, at an event in New Hampshire, Burgum said he believed addiction was the root of most of America's problems, including crime, homelessness, and mental health. He said that if elected president he would overhaul the reimbursement systems for mental health care and would find a place for the private sector to get involved in funding solutions for substance use disorders. As governor, Burgum shifted some of North Dakota's prisons to look more like mental health institutions, a policy he said he would attempt to emulate at the federal level.

=== National security ===
Burgum deployed the North Dakota National Guard to the southern border with Mexico numerous times to assist Texas. In April 2022, he and 25 other governors created the American Governors' Border Strike Force to help one another with border defense against illegal immigration and human trafficking. He argued that energy independence is key to fending off China and Russia.

During the 2024 Republican debate in Milwaukee, Burgum expressed concern about China, claiming it is America's "number one threat" and that the U.S. should put "anti-warship missiles in Taiwan." During campaign stops, Burgum expressed disdain for President Biden's handling of foreign aid to Ukraine and his hostage deals with Iran. He blamed Iran for the October 7 attacks on Israel, and said Iran was emboldened by Biden's release of $6 billion of previously frozen Iranian assets.

=== Cybersecurity ===
In 2019, Burgum signed legislation to develop a central cybersecurity operations center for the state's network of over 250,000 users and 400 state and local government entities under the Executive Branch's IT Department-North Dakota Information Technology (NDIT). At his direction, NDIT began a Multi-State Security Operations Center to facilitate threat intelligence sharing and coordinate cybersecurity operations between member states. In 2023, he signed House Bill 1398, requiring cybersecurity education for all K-12 Students, making North Dakota the first state to have a cybersecurity education requirement for its students.

=== LGBTQ rights ===
In July 2020, Burgum called the 2020 Republican platform "divisive and divisional" on LGBTQ issues. He signed numerous veto-proof bills sent by the North Dakota Legislative Assembly during its 2023 session that have been described as transphobic, including a near-total ban on gender-affirming care for minors.

=== Education ===
On November 12, 2021, Burgum signed a law banning the teaching of critical race theory in North Dakota K-12 schools. During the first Republican primary debate in Milwaukee, he spoke of his belief that federal regulations are unhelpful to schools and that red-tape regulations harm teacher innovations.

=== Entitlements ===
Burgum supports preserving existing entitlement programs, saying they should be federally protected. He also supports improving federal efficiency to free up more money for entitlement. In 2021 he signed a bill into law that exempted Social Security from North Dakota's state income tax.

== Personal life ==
Burgum married his first wife, Karen Stoker, in 1991. They had three children before divorcing in 2003. In 2016, Burgum married Kathryn Helgaas. As first lady of North Dakota, Kathryn Burgum led the Recovery Reinvented program on addiction and recovery. Burgum's daughter, Jesse, owns a film production company which put her on the Forbes 30 Under 30 list.

While campaigning for president in 2024, Burgum said in an interview that he likes the music of Keith Urban and enjoys watching the television shows Yellowstone and Ted Lasso.

=== Board work ===
Burgum served on the advisory board for the Stanford Graduate School of Business and was on the board of SuccessFactors during the 2000s, serving as chair from 2007 until the 2011 sale of the company to SAP. In 2012 he became the first chairman of the board for Atlassian, after it expanded from its initial board of three members (none of whom served as chair). During 2011 and 2014, he twice spent several months as the interim CEO of Intelligent InSites, a company for which he has served as the executive board chair since 2008. In the same year he became a member of Avalara's board of directors.

=== Philanthropy ===
In 2001, Burgum donated a refurbished school building he had acquired in 2000 to North Dakota State University. It was named Renaissance Hall and became home to the university's visual arts department, major components of the architecture and landscape architecture department, and the Tri-College University office. In 2008, Burgum started the Doug Burgum Family Fund, which focuses its charitable giving on youth, education, and health. In 2011, the Burgum family donated about $800,000 to the Plains Art Museum in Fargo to support its Center for Creativity, which is named in honor of Burgum's mother, Katherine Kilbourne Burgum.

== Awards and honors ==
Burgum received honorary doctorates from North Dakota State University in 2000 and the University of Mary in 2006.

In 2009, Burgum received the Theodore Roosevelt Roughrider Award from Governor John Hoeven.

== Electoral history ==
2016 Republican gubernatorial primary results
Party	Candidate	Votes	%
Republican	Doug Burgum	68,042	59.47%
Republican	Wayne Stenehjem	44,158	38.59%
Republican	Paul Sorum	2,164	1.89%
Republican	Write-in	51	0.04%
Total votes		114,415	100.00%

2016 North Dakota gubernatorial election
Party	Candidate	Votes	%
Republican	Doug Burgum	259,863	76.5
Democratic–NPL	Marvin Nelson	65,855	19.4
Libertarian	Marty Riske	13,230	3.9
Write-in		653	0.2
Total votes		339,601	100

2020 Republican gubernatorial primary results
Party	Candidate	Votes	%
Republican	Doug Burgum (incumbent)	96,119	89.51%
Republican	Michael Coachman	10,904	10.15%
Republican	Write-In	356	0.33%
Total votes		107,379	100.0%

2020 North Dakota gubernatorial election
Party	Candidate	Votes	%
Republican	Doug Burgum (incumbent)	235,479	65.8%
Democratic–NPL	Shelley Lenz	90,789	25.4%
Libertarian	DuWayne Hendrickson	13,853	3.9%
Write-in		17,538	4.9%
Total votes		357,659	100%

2024 Republican Presidential primary results
Party	Candidate	Votes	%
Republican	Donald Trump	17,015,756	76.42%
Republican	Nikki Haley	4,381,799	19.68%
Republican	Ron DeSantis	353,615	1.59%
Republican	Uncommitted	154,815	0.70%
Republican	Chris Christie	139,541	0.63%
Republican	Vivek Ramaswamy	96,954	0.44%
Republican	Asa Hutchinson	22,044	0.10%
Republican	Perry Johnson	4,051	0.02%
Republican	Tim Scott	1,598	0.01%
Republican	Doug Burgum	502	0.00%
Republican	Mike Pence	404	0.00%
Republican	Other candidates	93,796	0.42%
Total votes		22,264,875	100.00%

== Notes ==
Party political offices
Preceded by Jack Dalrymple	Republican nominee for Governor of North Dakota; 2016, 2020	Succeeded by Kelly Armstrong
Political offices
Preceded by Jack Dalrymple	Governor of North Dakota; 2016–2024	Succeeded by Kelly Armstrong
Preceded by Deb Haaland	United States Secretary of the Interior; 2025–present	Incumbent
Order of precedence
Preceded by Todd Blanche as United States Attorney General	Order of precedence of the United States as Secretary of the Interior	Succeeded by Brooke Rollins as United States Secretary of Agriculture
U.S. presidential line of succession
Preceded by Todd Blanche as United States Attorney General	Eighth in line as Secretary of the Interior	Succeeded by Brooke Rollins as United States Secretary of Agriculture
