= 2008 United States gubernatorial elections =

- November 4, 2008

13 governorships 11 states; 2 territories
	Majority party	Minority party
Party	Democratic	Republican
Seats before	28	22
Seats after	29	21
Seat change	▲1	▼1
Popular vote	8,395,587	7,901,188
Percentage	50.22%	47.26%
Seats up	6	5
Seats won	7	4
- Map of the results Democratic gain Democratic hold Republican hold New Progressive gain Nonpartisan politician No election

United States gubernatorial elections were held on November 4, 2008, in 11 states and two territories. These elections coincided with the presidential election, as well as the elections of the United States Senate and the United States House of Representatives and many local elections, state elections, and ballot propositions. Prior to the election, eight of the total seats were held by Democrats and five by Republicans. Two governors were prohibited by term limits from seeking re-election in 2008.

The only governorship to change party was the open seat in Missouri, which was won by a Democrat after being previously held by a Republican. This is the last time that Democrats gained governorships in a presidential year.

== Election predictions ==
State	Incumbent	Last race	Cook October 16, 2008	Sabato November 3, 2008	Rothenberg November 2, 2008	RCP November 4, 2008	Result
Delaware	Ruth Ann Minner (term-limited)	50.87% D	Safe D	Safe D	Safe D	Safe D	Markell; 67.52% D
Indiana	Mitch Daniels	53.21% R	Lean R	Lean R	Likely R	Lean R	Daniels; 57.84% R
Missouri	Matt Blunt (retired)	50.83% R	Lean D (flip)	Lean D (flip)	Likely D (flip)	Likely D (flip)	Nixon; 58.40% D (flip)
Montana	Brian Schweitzer	50.44% D	Safe D	Safe D	Safe D	Safe D	Schweitzer; 65.47% D
New Hampshire	John Lynch	74.01% D	Safe D	Safe D	Safe D	Safe D	Lynch; 70.15% D
North Carolina	Mike Easley (term-limited)	55.62% D	Tossup	Lean D	Tossup	Tossup	Perdue; 50.27% D
North Dakota	John Hoeven	71.26% R	Safe R	Safe R	Safe R	Safe R	Hoeven; 74.44% R
Utah	Jon Huntsman Jr.	57.74% R	Safe R	Safe R	Safe R	Safe R	Huntsman Jr. 77.63% R
Vermont	Jim Douglas	56.36% R	Likely R	Likely R	Safe R	Safe R	Douglas; 53.43% R
Washington	Christine Gregoire	48.87% D	Tossup	Lean D	Tossup	Tossup	Gregoire; 53.24% D
West Virginia	Joe Manchin	63.51% D	Safe D	Safe D	Safe D	Safe D	Manchin; 69.81% D

== Race summary ==
=== States ===
State	Incumbent	Party	First elected	Result	Candidates
Delaware	Ruth Ann Minner	Democratic	2000	Incumbent term-limited. New governor elected. Democratic hold.	▌ ✓ Jack Markell (Democratic) 67.5%; ▌Bill Lee (Republican) 32.1%
Indiana	Mitch Daniels	Republican	2004	Incumbent re-elected.	▌ ✓ Mitch Daniels (Republican) 57.8%; ▌Jill Long Thompson (Democratic) 40.1%; ▌Andy Horning (Libertarian) 2.1%
Missouri	Matt Blunt	Republican	2004	Incumbent retired. New governor elected. Democratic gain.	▌ ✓ Jay Nixon (Democratic) 58.4%; ▌Kenny Hulshof (Republican) 39.5%; ▌Andrew Finkenstadt (Libertarian) 1.1%; ▌Gregory Thompson (Constitution) 1.0%
Montana	Brian Schweitzer	Democratic	2004	Incumbent re-elected.	▌ ✓ Brian Schweitzer (Democratic) 65.5%; ▌Roy Brown (Republican) 32.5%; ▌Stan Jones (Libertarian) 2.0%
New Hampshire	John Lynch	Democratic	2004	Incumbent re-elected.	▌ ✓ John Lynch (Democratic) 70.2%; ▌Joseph Kenney (Republican) 27.6%; ▌Susan Newell (Libertarian) 2.2%
North Carolina	Mike Easley	Democratic	2000	Incumbent term-limited. New governor elected. Democratic hold.	▌ ✓ Bev Perdue (Democratic) 50.3%; ▌Pat McCrory (Republican) 46.9%; ▌Michael Munger (Libertarian) 2.9%
North Dakota	John Hoeven	Republican	2000	Incumbent re-elected.	▌ ✓ John Hoeven (Republican) 74.4%; ▌Tim Mathern (Democratic–NPL) 23.5%; ▌DuWayne Hendrickson (Independent) 2.0%
Utah	Jon Huntsman Jr.	Republican	2004	Incumbent re-elected.	▌ ✓ Jon Huntsman Jr. (Republican) 77.6%; ▌Bob Springmeyer (Democratic) 19.7%; ▌Dell Schanze (Libertarian) 2.6%
Vermont	Jim Douglas	Republican	2002	Incumbent re-elected.	▌ ✓ Jim Douglas (Republican) 53.4%; ▌Anthony Pollina (Independent) 21.8%; ▌Gaye Symington (Democratic) 21.7%
Washington	Christine Gregoire	Democratic	2004	Incumbent re-elected.	▌ ✓ Christine Gregoire (Democratic) 53.2%; ▌Dino Rossi (Republican) 46.8%
West Virginia	Joe Manchin	Democratic	2004	Incumbent re-elected.	▌ ✓ Joe Manchin (Democratic) 69.8%; ▌Russ Weeks (Republican) 25.7%; ▌Jesse Johnson (Mountain) 4.5%

=== Territories ===
Territory	Incumbent	Party	First elected	Result	Candidates
American Samoa	Togiola Tulafono	Democratic	2004	Incumbent re-elected.	▌ ✓ Togiola Tulafono (Democratic) 56.4%; ▌Utu Abe Malae (Republican) 43.6%
Puerto Rico	Aníbal Acevedo Vilá	Popular Democratic	2004	Incumbent lost re-election. New governor elected. New Progressive gain.	▌ ✓ Luis Fortuño (PNP) 52.8%; ▌Aníbal Acevedo Vilá (PPD) 41.3%; ▌Rogelio Figueroa (PPR) 2.8%; ▌Edwin Irizarry Mora (PIP) 2.0%

== Closest races ==
States where the margin of victory was under 5%:

1. North Carolina, 3.39%

States where the margin of victory was under 10%:

1. Washington, 6.48%

Blue denotes states won by Democrats.

== Delaware ==
2008 Delaware gubernatorial election
- November 4, 2008
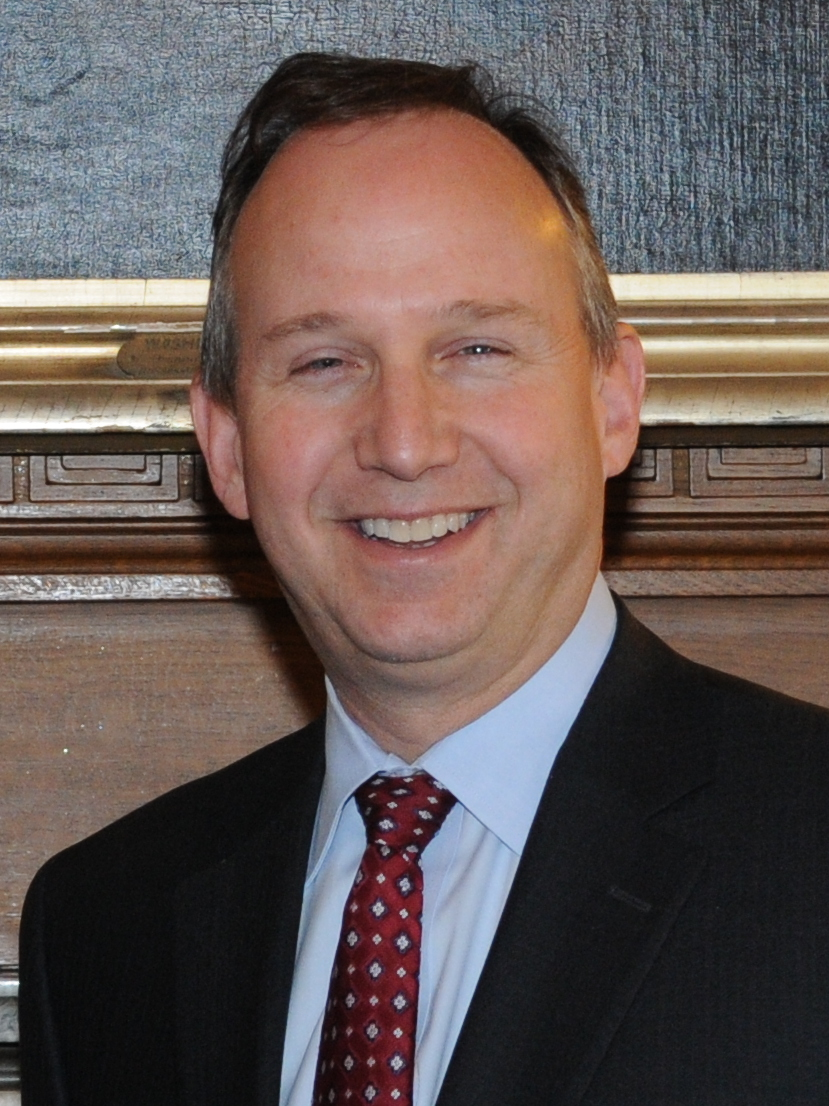

Nominee	Jack Markell	Bill Lee
Party	Democratic	Republican
Popular vote	266,861	126,662
Percentage	67.5%	32.0%
- County results
Governor before election
Ruth Ann Minner
Democratic
Elected Governor
Jack Markell
Democratic

Ruth Ann Minner was term-limited in 2008. As of 2008, Democrats had controlled the Delaware governorship for 16 years. In an upset, state Treasurer Jack Markell defeated Lieutenant Governor John Carney by 51 to 49% for the Democratic nomination on September 9. The Republican nominee was former state Superior Court Judge Bill Lee, defeating airline pilot Michael Protrack. Lee was the Republican nominee for governor in 2004, and lost to Minner by a narrow margin.

The race got more attention due to the vice presidential candidacy of U.S. Senator Joe Biden. Since Biden, a senator, was elected to be Vice President, he needed to resign his Senate seat. The new governor was then called upon to appoint someone to replace Biden in the Senate. Since Lee would naturally have been more inclined to select a Republican, his election could have caused a Republican pickup in the Senate by proxy. However, he was defeated by a wide margin on election day by Markell. Senator Biden resigned his seat in the United States Senate on January 15, 2009, and Governor Minner appointed Ted Kaufman to Biden's seat. Kaufman had previously served as Senator Biden's Chief of Staff during his tenure in the United States Senate.

Delaware election
Party	Candidate	Votes	%
Democratic	Jack Markell	266,861	67.52
Republican	Bill Lee	126,662	32.05
Blue Enigma	Jeffrey Brown	1,681	0.43
Total votes		395,204	100.00
Democratic hold			

== Indiana ==
2008 Indiana gubernatorial election
- November 4, 2008
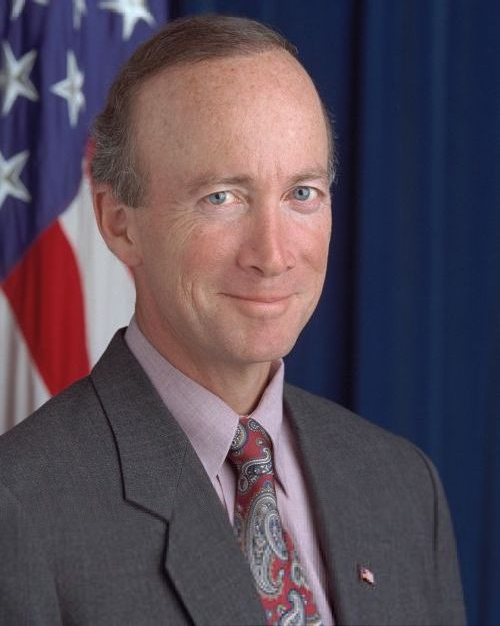

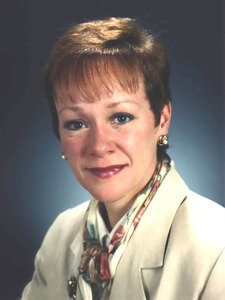
Nominee	Mitch Daniels	Jill Long Thompson
Party	Republican	Democratic
Running mate	Becky Skillman	Dennie Oxley
Popular vote	1,563,885	1,082,463
Percentage	57.8%	40.1%
- County results
Governor before election
Mitch Daniels
Republican
Elected Governor
Mitch Daniels
Republican

Incumbent Republican Mitch Daniels faced Democratic nominee former Congresswoman and Undersecretary of Agriculture Jill Long Thompson, and Libertarian nominee engineer Andy Horning, who also ran for governor in 2000.

Some pundits thought Mitch Daniels was vulnerable in 2008, but polling taken by SurveyUSA on October 21 and 22, 2008 showed him with a significant 54–35 lead. He won re-election easily, confirming these predictions.

While Indiana had not voted Democratic for president since 1964, Daniels was the first Republican elected governor in 16 years there. Daniels was also endorsed by the state's largest newspapers, the Indianapolis Star, the Evansville Courier & Press, the Fort Wayne Journal Gazette, the Times of Northwest Indiana, the Gary Post-Tribune and the Louisville Courier-Journal.

Indiana election
Party	Candidate	Votes	%
Republican	Mitch Daniels (incumbent)	1,563,885	57.84
Democratic	Jill Long Thompson	1,082,463	40.04
Libertarian	Andy Horning	57,376	2.12
Write-in		27	0.00
Total votes		2,703,751	100.00
Republican hold			

== Missouri ==
2008 Missouri gubernatorial election
- November 4, 2008
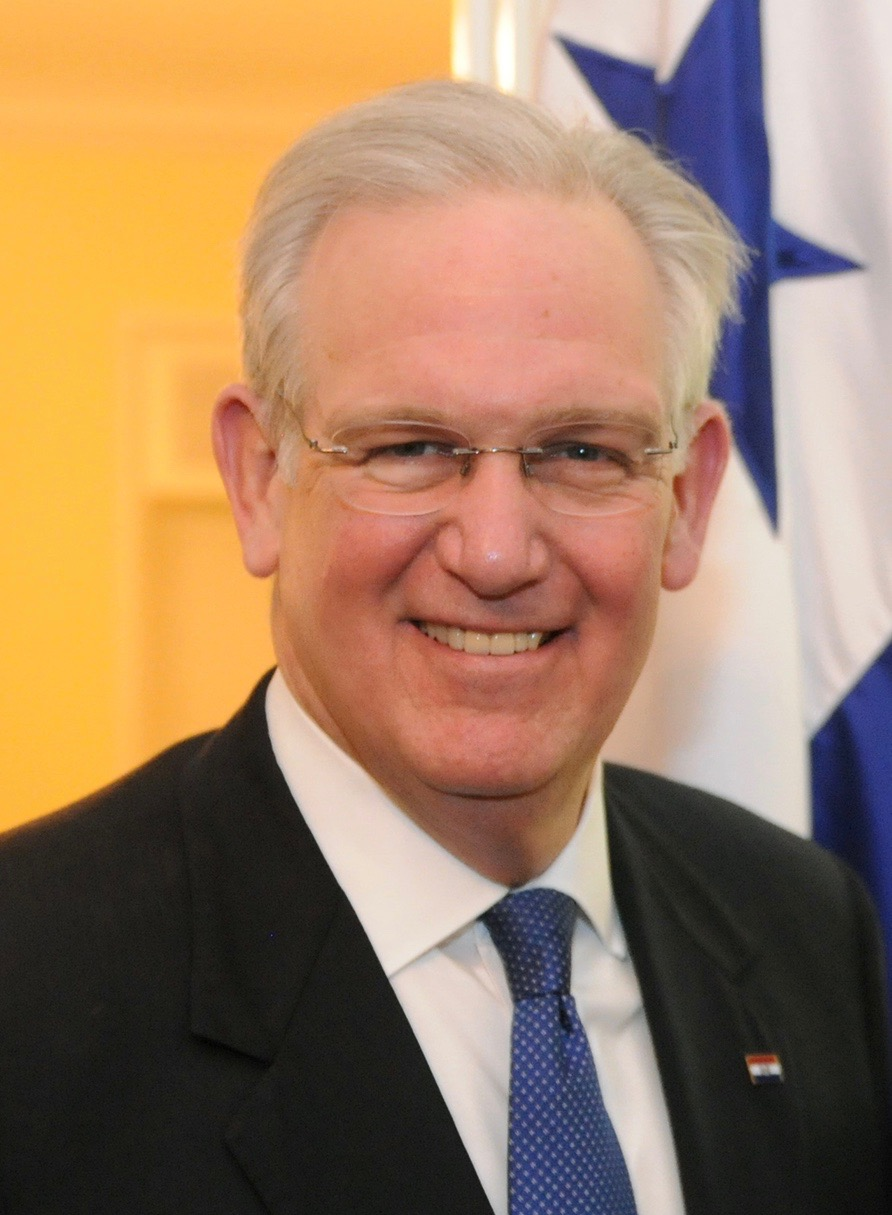

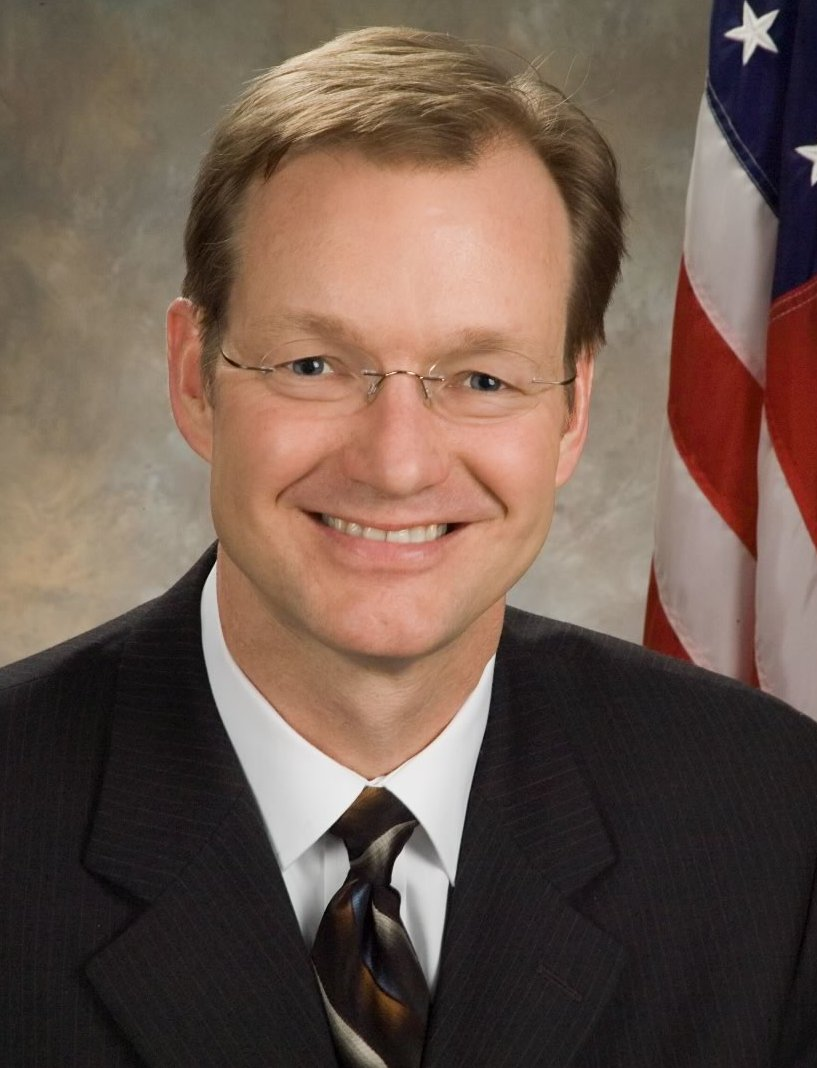
Nominee	Jay Nixon	Kenny Hulshof
Party	Democratic	Republican
Popular vote	1,680,611	1,136,364
Percentage	58.4%	39.5%
- County results
Governor before election
Matt Blunt
Republican
Elected Governor
Jay Nixon
Democratic

Matt Blunt was considered to be the most vulnerable incumbent in the 2008 election cycle, but decided on January 22, 2008, not to seek re-election. Blunt's approval rating was the nation's second-lowest after Governor Ernie Fletcher of Kentucky for much of 2007, though his approval rating improved and approached 50% in a May poll conducted by SurveyUSA.

The Republican nominee was Congressman Kenny Hulshof. The Democratic nominee was four-term Missouri Attorney General Jay Nixon, who ran unsuccessfully for the U.S. Senate in 1998. Nixon defeated Hulshof comfortably, despite the fact that Missouri ultimately voted for John McCain, a Republican, for president. Missouri was the only state not to re-elect the incumbent party for governor in 2008.

Missouri election
Party	Candidate	Votes	%
Democratic	Jay Nixon	1,680,611	58.40
Republican	Kenny Hulshof	1,136,364	39.49
Libertarian	Andrew Finkenstadt	31,850	1.11
Constitution	Gregory Thompson	28,941	1.01
Write-in		12	0.00
Total votes		2,877,778	100.00
Democratic gain from Republican			

== Montana ==
2008 Montana gubernatorial election
- November 4, 2008
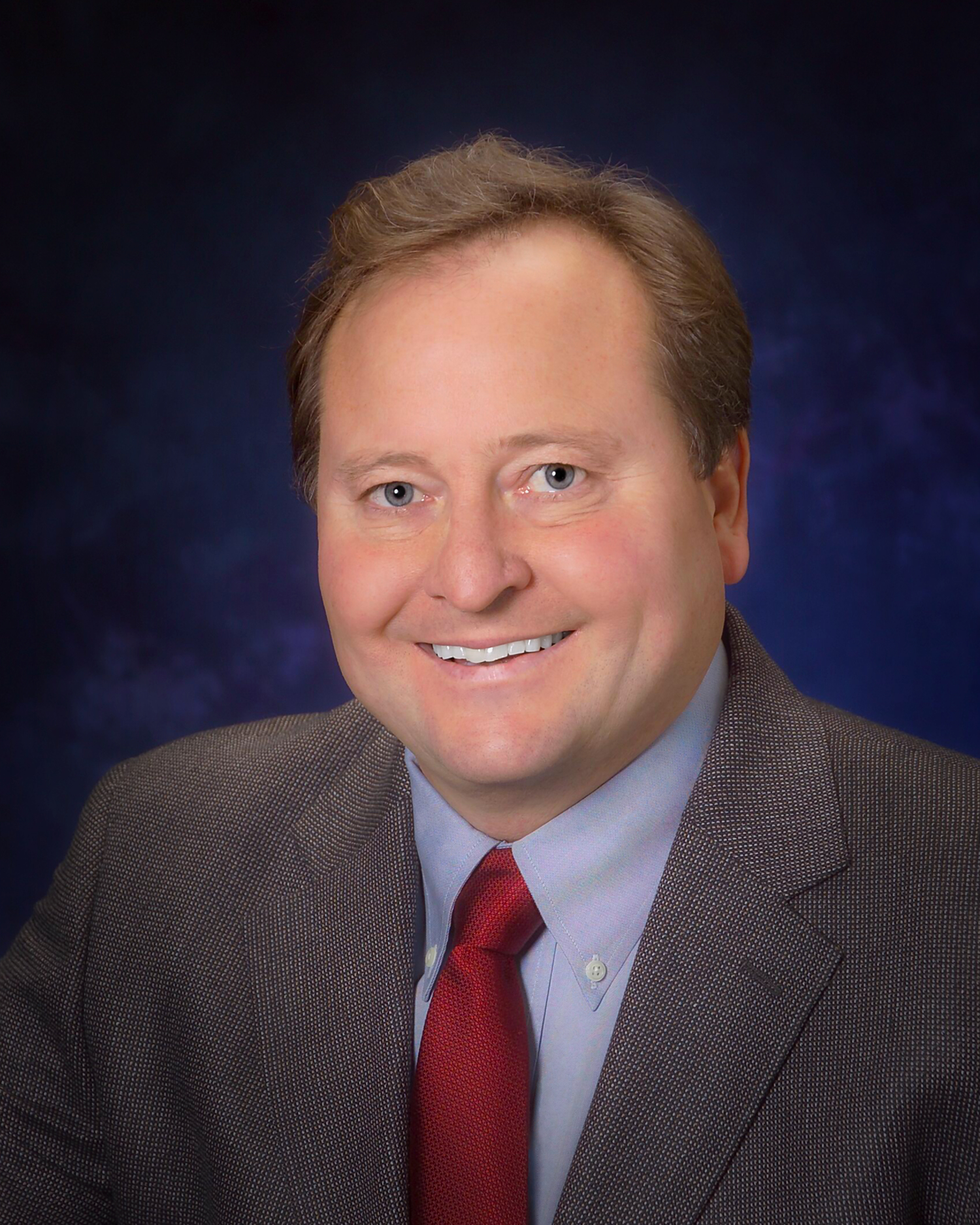

Nominee	Brian Schweitzer	Roy Brown
Party	Democratic	Republican
Running mate	John Bohlinger	Steve Daines
Popular vote	318,670	158,268
Percentage	65.5%	32.5%
- County results
Governor before election
Brian Schweitzer
Democratic
Elected Governor
Brian Schweitzer
Democratic

Democrat Brian Schweitzer of Montana (running with Lt. Governor John Bohlinger) was heavily favored to win re-election as he had better funding and high approval ratings as current Governor. The Republican nominee was State Senator Roy Brown (running with Steve Daines), and the Libertarian nominee was Stan Jones (running with Michael Baker). Schweitzer won some press coverage with his well-received speech to the 2008 Democratic National Convention. He was criticized, however, for a speech in July in which he jested that he helped defeat U.S. Senator Conrad Burns in 2006 by tampering with the vote totals, which he insisted was purely a joke. Schweitzer won re-election by a comfortable margin despite the criticism.

Montana election
Party	Candidate	Votes	%
Democratic	Brian Schweitzer (incumbent)	318,670	65.47
Republican	Roy Brown	158,268	32.52
Libertarian	Stan Jones	9,796	2.01
Total votes		486,734	100.00
Democratic hold			

== New Hampshire ==
2008 New Hampshire gubernatorial election
- November 4, 2008
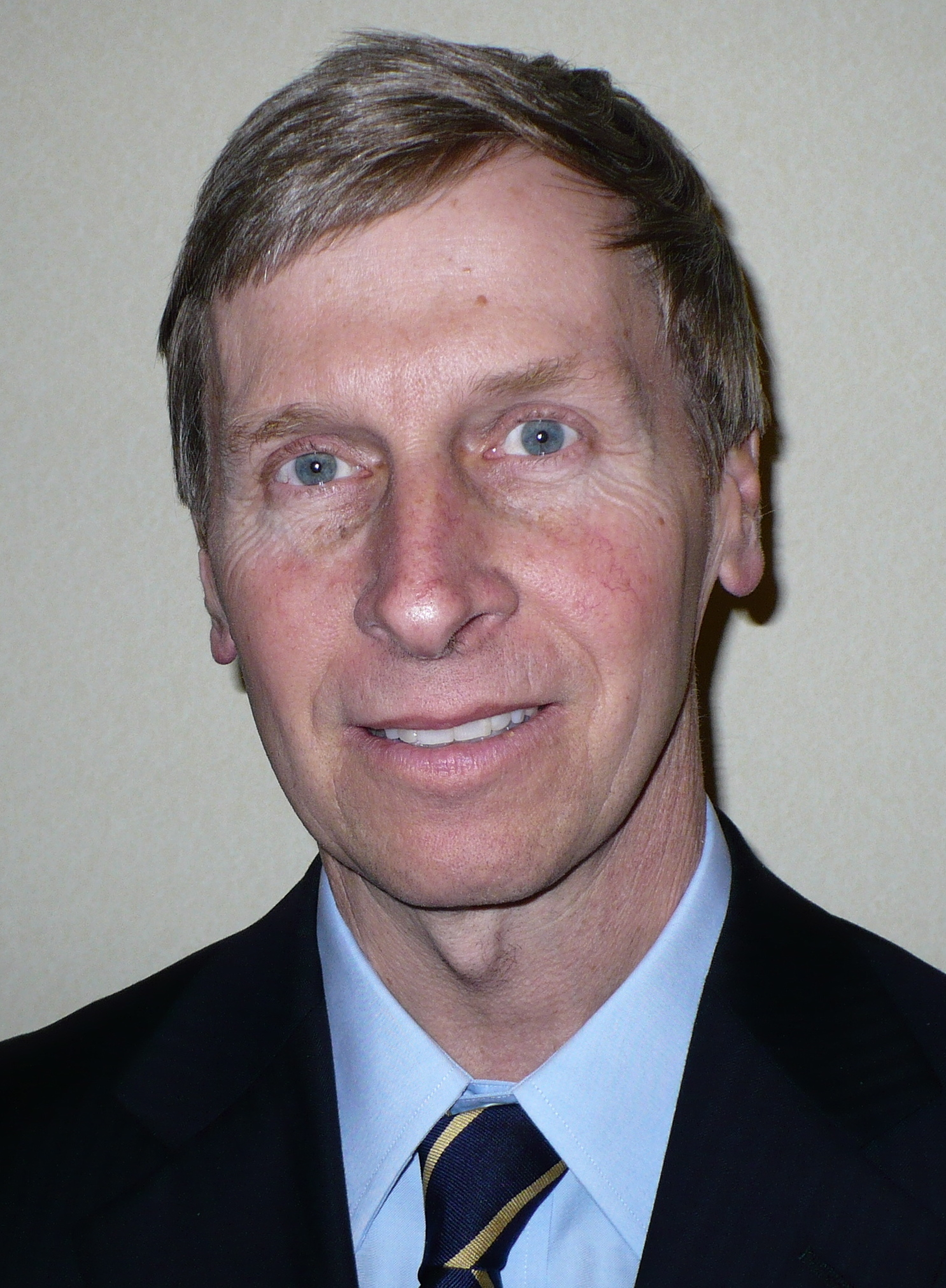

Nominee	John Lynch	Joseph Kenney
Party	Democratic	Republican
Popular vote	479,042	188,555
Percentage	70.1%	27.6%
- County results
Governor before election
John Lynch
Democratic
Elected Governor
John Lynch
Democratic

In New Hampshire, Democrat John Lynch easily won re-election against State Senator Joseph D. Kenney, the Republican nominee.

NOTE: New Hampshire's gubernatorial elections are held every in alternate (even-numbered) years, instead of every fourth year.

New Hampshire election
Party	Candidate	Votes	%
Democratic	John Lynch (incumbent)	479,042	70.15
Republican	Joseph Kenney	188,555	27.61
Libertarian	Susan Newell	14,987	2.19
Write-in		326	0.05
Total votes		682,910	100.00
Democratic hold			

== North Carolina ==
2008 North Carolina gubernatorial election
- November 4, 2008
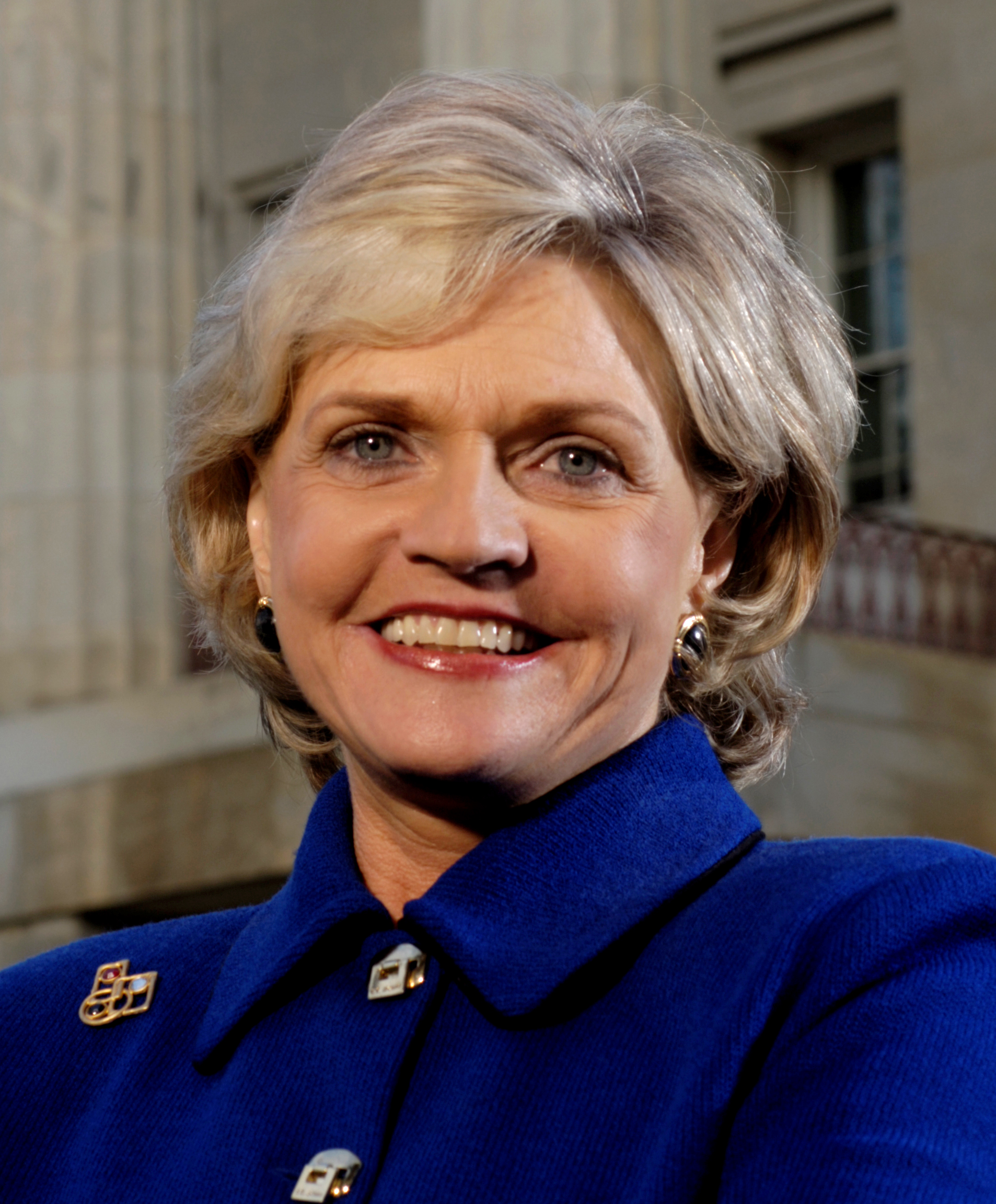

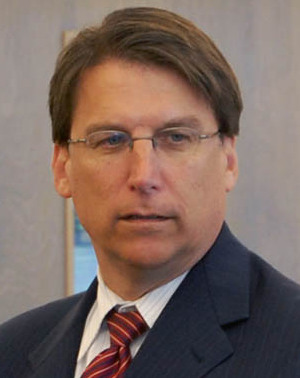
Nominee	Bev Perdue	Pat McCrory
Party	Democratic	Republican
Popular vote	2,146,189	2,001,168
Percentage	50.3%	46.9%
- County results
Governor before election
Mike Easley
Democratic
Elected Governor
Bev Perdue
Democratic

Mike Easley was term-limited in 2008, in another state whose governorship had been held by Democrats for 16 years. Democratic Lieutenant Governor Beverly Perdue was the Democratic nominee, defeating Charlotte Mayor Pat McCrory, the Republican nominee.

North Carolina election
Party	Candidate	Votes	%
Democratic	Bev Perdue	2,146,189	50.27
Republican	Pat McCrory	2,001,168	46.88
Libertarian	Michael Munger	121,584	2.85
Total votes		4,268,941	100.00
Democratic hold			

== North Dakota ==
2008 North Dakota gubernatorial election
- November 4, 2008
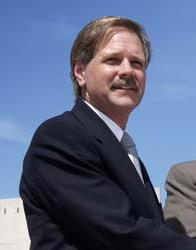

Nominee	John Hoeven	Tim Mathern
Party	Republican	Democratic–NPL
Running mate	Jack Dalrymple	Merle Boucher
Popular vote	235,009	74,279
Percentage	74.4%	23.5%
- County results
Governor before election
John Hoeven
Republican
Elected Governor
John Hoeven
Republican

Republican John Hoeven announced he would seek re-election for a third term in 2008. He won re-election with 74% of the vote. Soundly defeating the Democratic gubernatorial nominee, State Senator Tim Mathern, (24%) and independent candidate DuWayne Hendrickson (2%).

North Dakota election
Party	Candidate	Votes	%
Republican	John Hoeven (incumbent)	235,009	74.44
Democratic–NPL	Tim Mathern	74,279	23.53
Independent	DuWayne Hendrickson	6,404	2.03
Total votes		315,692	100.00
Republican hold			

== Utah ==
2008 Utah gubernatorial election
- November 4, 2008
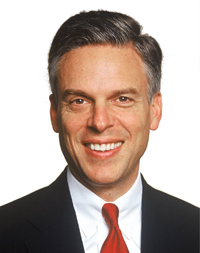

Nominee	Jon Huntsman Jr.	Bob Springmeyer
Party	Republican	Democratic
Running mate	Gary Herbert	Josie Valdez
Popular vote	735,049	186,503
Percentage	77.6%	19.7%
- County results
Governor before election
Jon Huntsman Jr.
Republican
Elected Governor
Jon Huntsman Jr.
Republican

Jon Huntsman Jr. was heavily favored to win re-election in Utah. As of 2008, Republicans had controlled the Utah governorship for 24 years. Democrat Bob Springmeyer challenged Huntsman, but was decisively defeated.

Utah election
Party	Candidate	Votes	%
Republican	Jon Huntsman Jr. (incumbent)	735,049	77.63
Democratic	Bob Springmeyer	186,503	19.72
Libertarian	Dell Schanze	24,820	2.62
Write-in		153	0.02
Total votes		945,525	100.00
Republican hold			

== Vermont ==
2008 Vermont gubernatorial election
- November 4, 2008
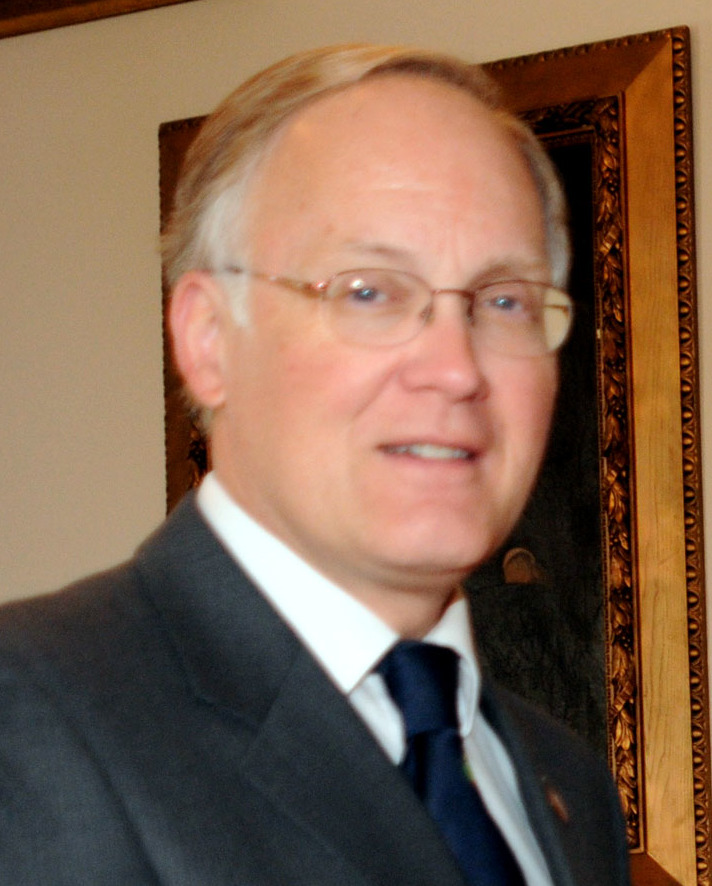

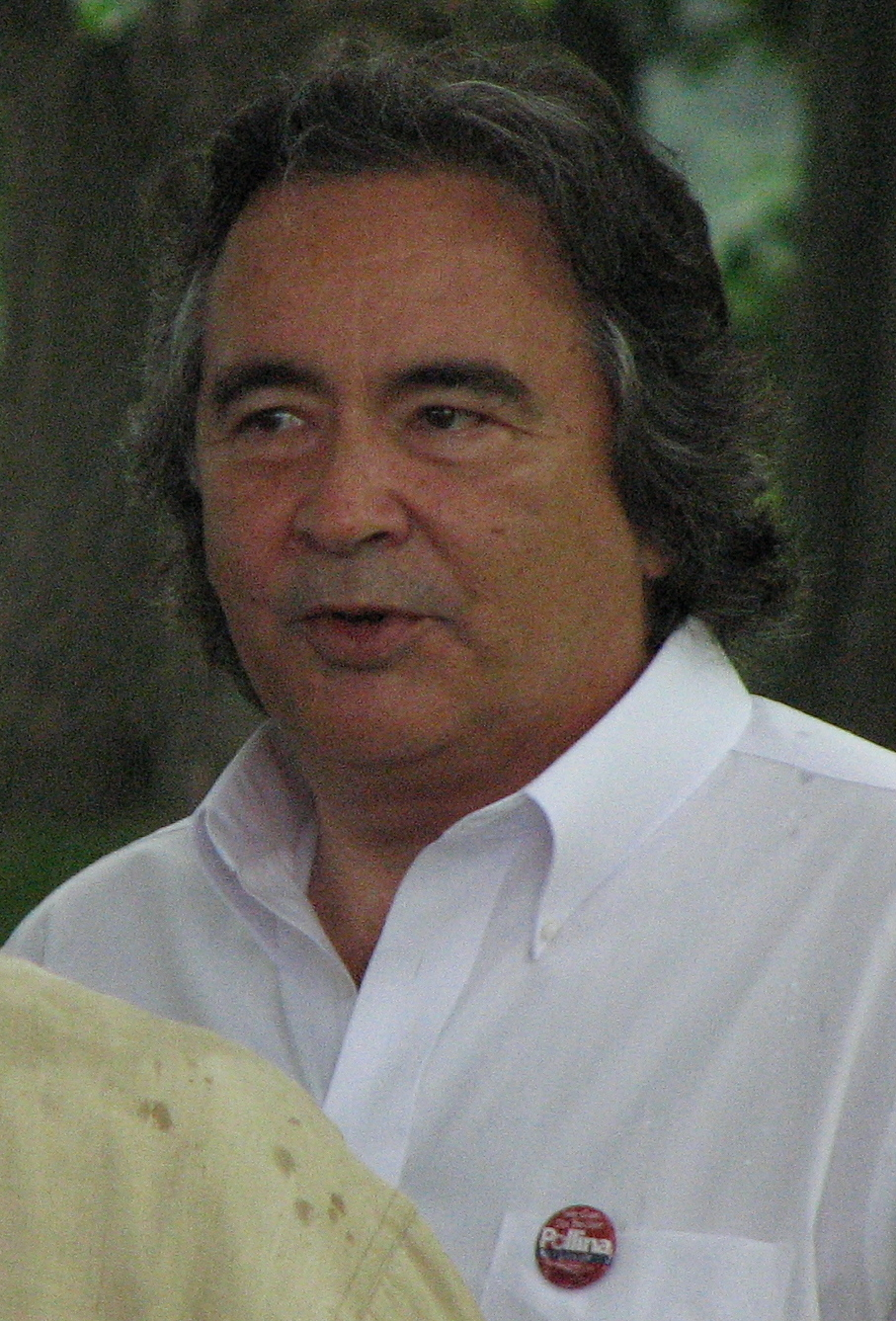

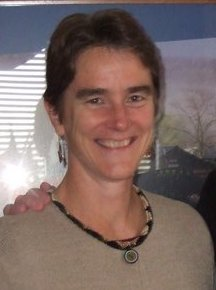
Nominee	Jim Douglas	Anthony Pollina	Gaye Symington
Party	Republican	Independent	Democratic
Popular vote	170,492	69,791	69,534
Percentage	53.4%	21.8%	21.7%
- County results
Governor before election
Jim Douglas
Republican
Elected Governor
Jim Douglas
Republican

Three-term incumbent Jim Douglas ran as a Republican, and House Speaker Gaye Symington ran as a Democrat. Other candidates included Anthony Pollina of the Vermont Progressive Party and Cris Ericson of the Marijuana Party. Douglas was re-elected.

Vermont election
Party	Candidate	Votes	%
Republican	Jim Douglas (incumbent)	170,492	53.43
Independent	Anthony Pollina	69,791	21.87
Democratic	Gaye Symington	69,534	21.79
Independent	Tony O'Connor	3,106	0.97
Independent	Sam Young	2,490	0.78
Liberty Union	Peter Diamondstone	1,710	0.54
Independent	Cris Ericson	1,704	0.53
Write-in		258	0.08
Total votes		319,085	100.00
Republican hold			

== Washington ==
2008 Washington gubernatorial election
- November 4, 2008
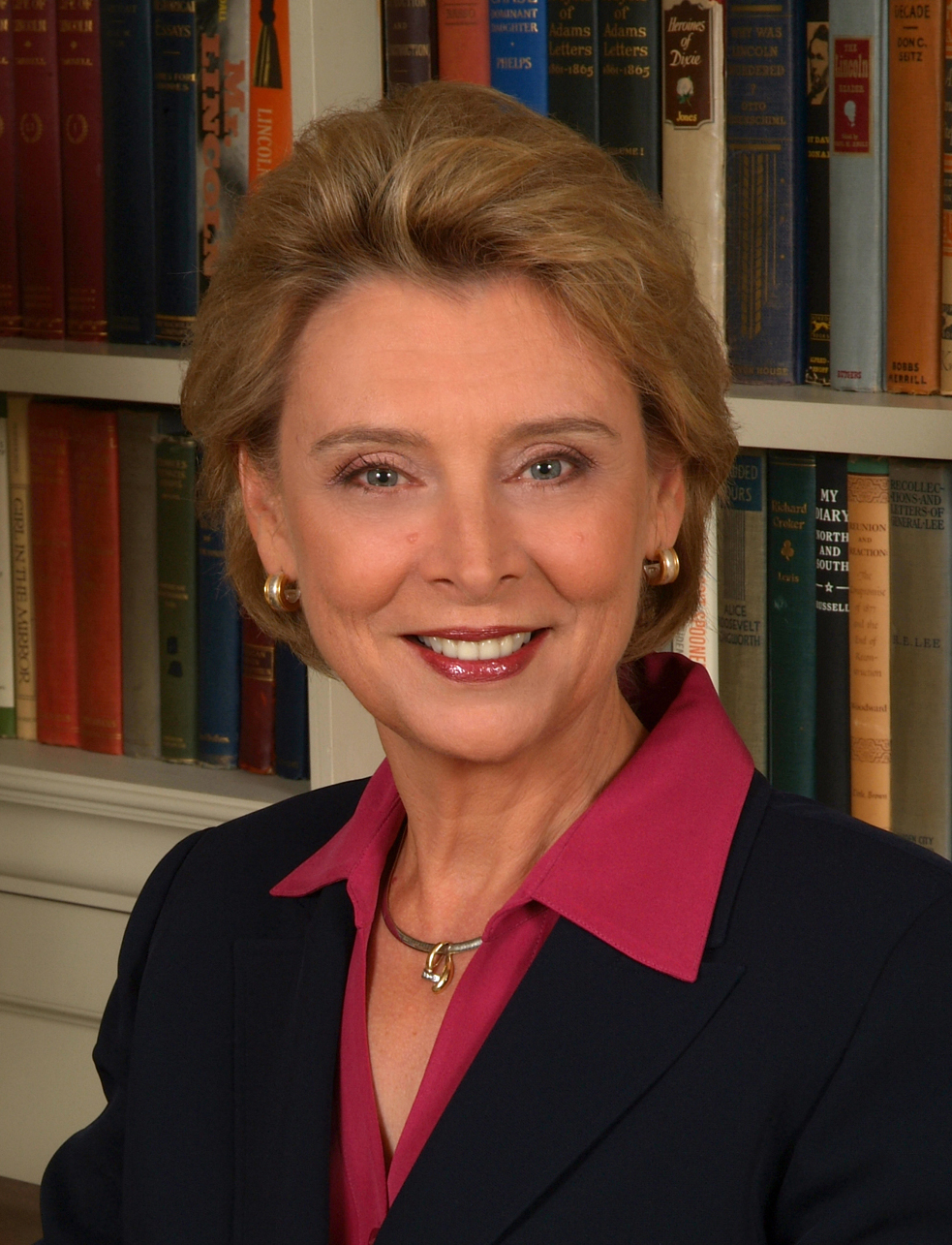

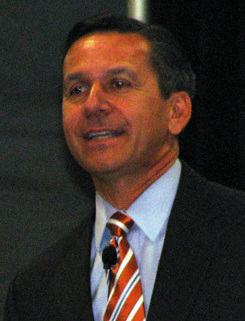
Nominee	Christine Gregoire	Dino Rossi
Party	Democratic	Republican
Popular vote	1,598,738	1,404,124
Percentage	53.2%	46.8%
- County results
Governor before election
Christine Gregoire
Democratic
Elected Governor
Christine Gregoire
Democratic

Democrat Christine Gregoire is perhaps best known for having won in 2004 by 133 votes in the third official count, after having lost the initial count by 261 votes and the first recount by 24 votes. Her 2004 opponent, Republican former State Senator Dino Rossi, officially announced his candidacy on October 25, 2007. Pre-election SurveyUSA polls showed Gregoire leading Rossi with a 50% to 47% margin. A September 10 poll by Rasmussen Reports showed Rossi pulling ahead by a 52% to 46% margin. The race was expected to be extremely close, but Gregoire was reelected by a wider than expected margin of 6.48%.

Washington election
Party	Candidate	Votes	%
Democratic	Christine Gregoire (incumbent)	1,598,738	53.24
Republican	Dino Rossi	1,404,124	46.76
Total votes		3,002,862	100.00
Democratic hold			

== West Virginia ==
2008 West Virginia gubernatorial election
- November 4, 2008
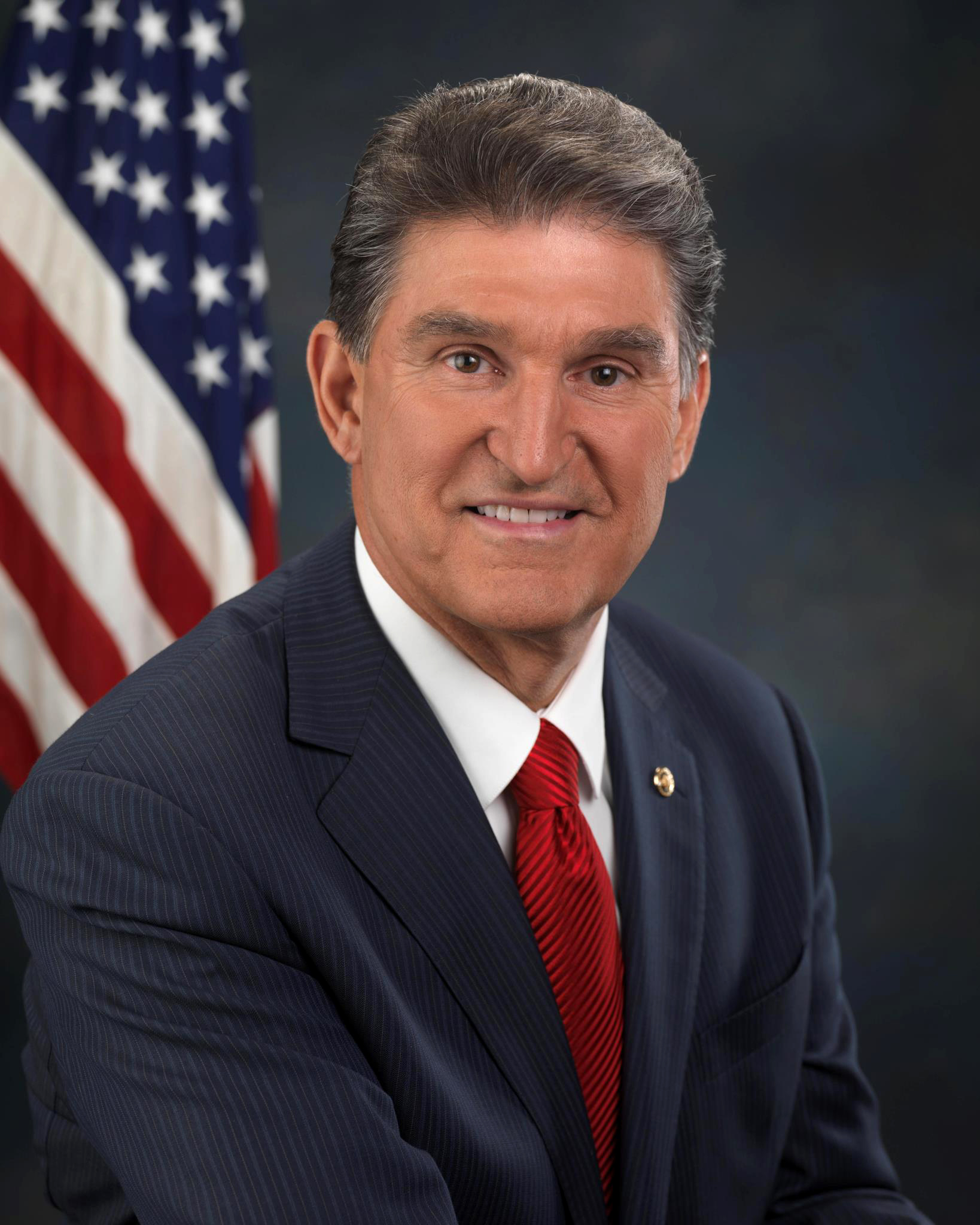

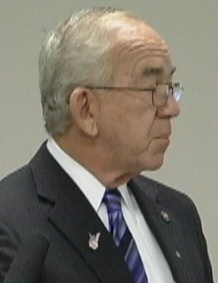
Nominee	Joe Manchin	Russ Weeks
Party	Democratic	Republican
Popular vote	492,697	181,612
Percentage	69.8%	25.7%
- County results
Governor before election
Joe Manchin
Democratic
Elected Governor
Joe Manchin
Democratic

Democrat Joe Manchin ran for re-election in West Virginia and was heavily favored according to pre-election polls. On November 4, he faced former State Senator Russ Weeks, a Republican, and Mountain Party candidate Jesse Johnson, who ran in 2004. Butch Paugh of the Constitution Party also attempted a run but failed to qualify for the ballot. Manchin won re-election by a landslide.

West Virginia election
Party	Candidate	Votes	%
Democratic	Joe Manchin (incumbent)	492,697	69.81
Republican	Russ Weeks	181,612	25.73
Mountain	Jesse Johnson	31,486	4.46
Total votes		705,795	100.00
Democratic hold			

== Territories ==
=== American Samoa ===
2008 American Samoa gubernatorial election
- November 18, 2008
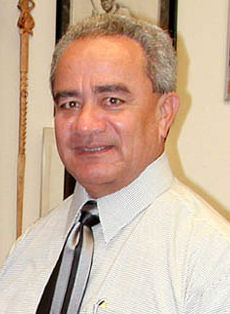

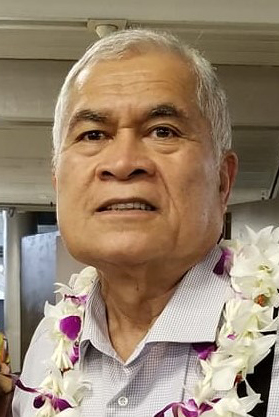
Candidate	Togiola Tulafono	Utu Abe Malae
Party	Nonpartisan	Nonpartisan
Popular vote	6,590	5,084
Percentage	56.4%	43.6%
Governor before election
Togiola Tulafono
Democratic
Elected Governor
Togiola Tulafono
Democratic

American Samoa's Togiola Tulafono sought re-election in 2008 with Lieutenant Governor Ipulasi Aitofele Sunia. He won his first term 55.7% to 44.3% in the 2004 run-off against Afoa Moega Lutu. Tulafono was again challenged by Afoa Moega Lutu and Velega Savali, who ran as a nonpartisan team for governor and lieutenant governor respectively. Utu Abe Malae and Tuika Tuika also ran to become the next Governor on separate, nonpartisan tickets. Tulafono won in a close vote that split three ways.

American Samoa election
Party	Candidate	Votes	%
Nonpartisan	Togiola Tulafono (incumbent)	6,590	56.45
Nonpartisan	Utu Abe Malae	5,084	43.55
Total votes		11,674	100.00
Democratic hold			

=== Puerto Rico ===
2008 Puerto Rico gubernatorial election
- November 4, 2008
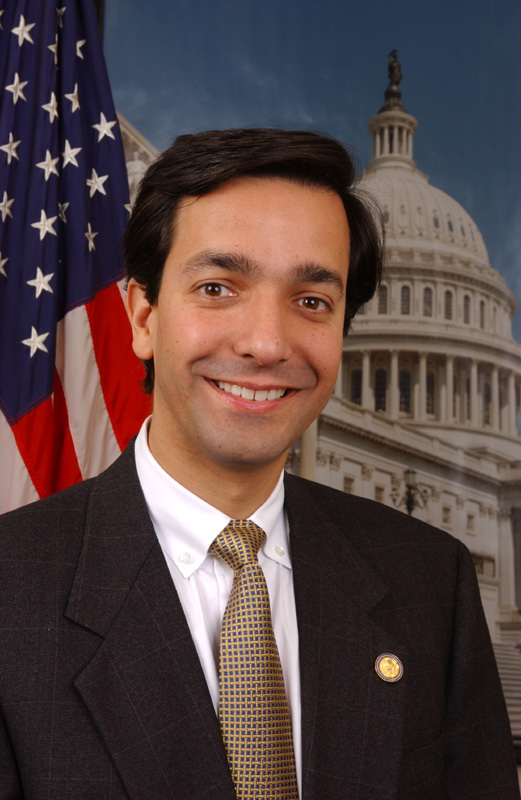

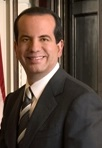
Nominee	Luis Fortuño	Aníbal Acevedo Vilá
Party	New Progressive	Popular Democratic
Popular vote	1,025,965	801,071
Percentage	52.8%	41.3%
- Municipality results
Governor before election
Aníbal Acevedo Vilá
Popular Democratic
Elected Governor
Luis Fortuño
New Progressive

Aníbal Acevedo Vilá of Puerto Rico ran for a second term in 2008. In 2004, Acevedo narrowly beat former Governor and Senator Pedro Rosselló, also a Democrat, by a mere 3,566 votes.

Republican at-large Resident Commissioner Luis Fortuño, who announced in December 2006 that he would not again seek re-election to his current post, ran against him. There was also a movement to elect Senator Rosselló as a write-in choice for governor.

The Puerto Rican Independence Party's candidate was Edwin Irizarry Mora, while a fourth candidate, Rogelio Figueroa (Puerto Ricans for Puerto Rico Party), ran on an environmentalist platform.

Acevedo was defeated by Fortuño on election day. The federal indictment against Acevedo for alleged corruption schemes when he was in Congress, and generally low approval, may have been a drag on his candidacy and chances of winning re-election.

Puerto Rico election
Party	Candidate	Votes	%
New Progressive	Luis Fortuño	1,025,965	52.77
Popular Democratic	Aníbal Acevedo Vilá (incumbent)	801,071	41.29
Puerto Ricans for Puerto Rico	Rogelio Figueroa	53,693	2.76
Independence	Edwin Irizarry Mora	39,590	2.04
Write-in		13,215	0.64
Total votes		1,933,534	100.00
New Progressive gain from Popular Democratic			

== See also ==
- 2008 United States elections
  - 2008 United States presidential election
  - 2008 United States Senate elections
  - 2008 United States House of Representatives elections
