= 2016 American Samoan general election =

- Gubernatorial election
- November 8, 2016
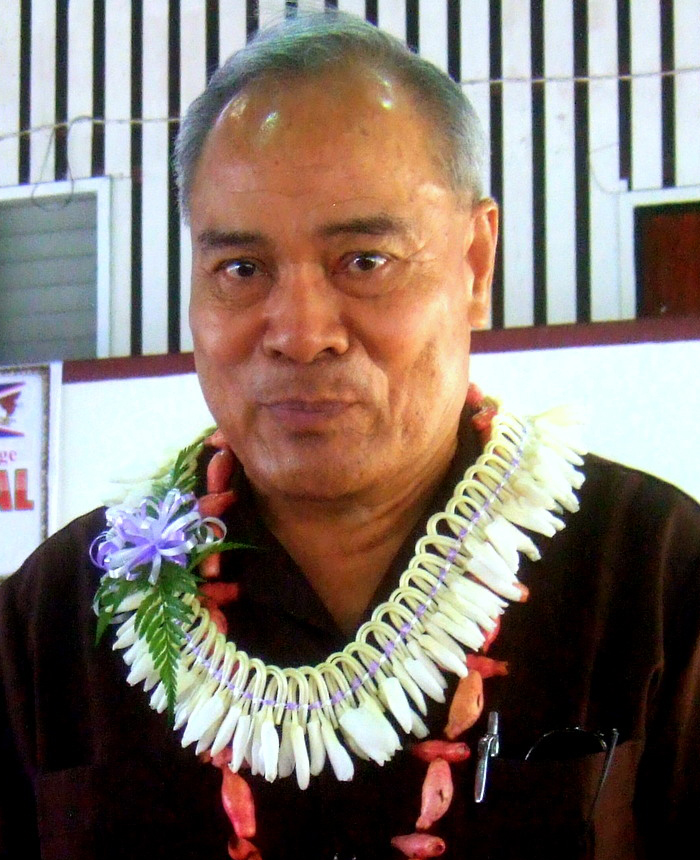

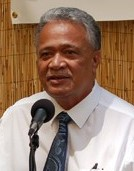
Nominee	Lolo Matalasi Moliga	Faoa Aitofele Sunia
Party	Independent	Independent
Alliance	Democratic	Democratic
Running mate	Lemanu Peleti Mauga	Larry Sanitoa
Popular vote	7,235	4,305
Percentage	60.17%	35.80%
- Results by voting district: Moliga : 50–55% 55–60% 60–65% 65–70% 70–75% 75–80% Sunia: 55–60%
Governor before election
Lolo Matalasi Moliga
Democratic
Elected Governor
Lolo Matalasi Moliga
Democratic
- Delegate election
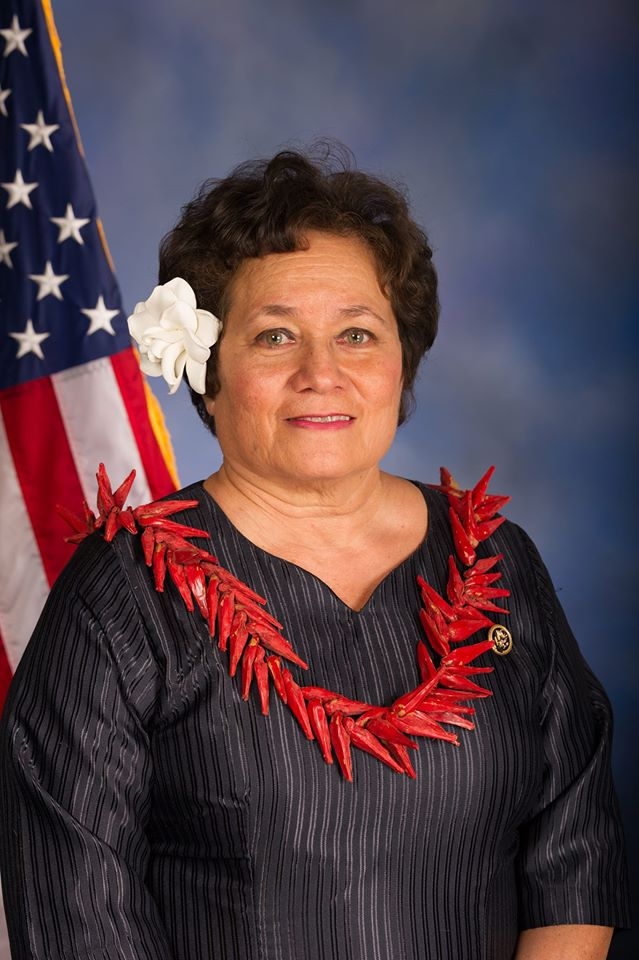

Candidate	Amata Coleman Radewagen	Salu Hunkin-Finau	Mapu Jamias
Party	Republican	Democratic	Democratic
Popular vote	8,924	1,581	978
Percentage	75.40%	13.26%	8.26%
- Results by voting district: Radewagen: 55–60% 60–65% 65–70% 70–75% 75–80% 80–85% 85–90%
Delegate before election
Amata Coleman Radewagen
Republican
Elected Delegate
Amata Coleman Radewagen
Republican

General elections were held in American Samoa on November 8, 2016, coinciding with the 2016 United States presidential elections and other US elections.

Incumbent Governor Lolo Matalasi Moliga sought re-election and won, defeating Faoa Aitofele Sunia by 60% to 36%, while Tuika Tuika received 4% of the vote.

Incumbent delegate Amata Coleman Radewagen, a Republican who had held the seat since 2015, also successfully sought re-election to a second term. Aumua Amata won re-election with 75% of votes cast, the highest number of votes for any elective office in the history of American Samoa.

== Background ==
In November 2014 Radewagen defeated 10-term incumbent Democratic representative Eni Faleomavaega in a crowded race for the delegate seat.

== Gubernatorial candidates ==
- Lolo Matalasi Moliga, incumbent governor, affiliated with the Democratic Party

- Running mate: Lemanu Peleti Mauga, incumbent Lieutenant Governor

- Faoa Aitofele Sunia, former lieutenant governor, affiliated with the Democratic Party

- Running mate: Larry Sanitoa, Territorial Representative

- Tuika Tuika, accountant and candidate for governor in 2008, affiliated with the Republican Party

- Running mate: Iuni Maeva, veteran

== Delegate candidates ==
Five candidates filed to run for election to American Samoa's lone seat in the United States House of Representatives: three women and two men. All elections in American Samoa were officially non-partisan, though candidates have identified with a particular political party.

=== Democratic ===
- Vaitinasa Dr. Salu Hunkin-Finau, educator, former president of American Samoa Community College, 2012 candidate for Governor of American Samoa, sister of former Delegate Eni Faleomavaega.
- Paepaetele Mapu Saei Jamias, retired U.S. Army lieutenant colonel, president of the American Samoa National Olympic Committee
- Meleagi Suitonu-Chapman, retired U.S. federal government employee

=== Republican ===
- Amata Coleman Radewagen, incumbent delegate for the United States House of Representatives

=== Independents ===
- Tim Jones, engineer and 2012 candidate for Governor of American Samoa

=== Withdrew ===
- Tua'au Kereti Mata'utia, withdrew from race on in July 2016

== Campaign ==
=== Delegate ===
A congressional campaign forum, attended by all five candidates, was held at American Samoa Community College (ASCC) on October 6, 2016.

== Results ==
=== Governor ===
Candidate	Running mate	Votes	%
Lolo Matalasi Moliga	Lemanu Peleti Mauga	7,235	60.17
Faoa Aitofele Sunia	Larry Sanitoa	4,305	35.80
Tuika Tuika	Iuni Maeva	484	4.03
Total		12,024	100.00
Source: Election Office

=== Delegate ===
Candidate	Party	Votes	%
Amata Coleman Radewagen	Republican Party	8,924	75.40
Salu Hunkin-Finau	Democratic Party	1,581	13.36
Mapu Jamias	Democratic Party	978	8.26
Meleagi Suitonu-Chapman	Democratic Party	181	1.53
Timothy Jones	Independent	171	1.44
Total		11,835	100.00
Source: US House of Representatives

=== House of Representatives ===
District	Candidate	Votes	%
1 – Manuʻa	Fetu Fetui Jr.	500	41.46
1 – Manuʻa	Vesi Talalelei Fautanu Jr.	374	31.01
1 – Manuʻa	Mailo Oge T. Nua	219	18.16
1 – Manuʻa	Ofisa Asoau Jr.	113	9.37
2 – Manuʻa	Toeaina Faufano Autele	153	38.73
2 – Manuʻa	Fetui Rames Howard Molipe	127	32.15
2 – Manuʻa	Auega Taulaga Sualevai	72	18.23
2 – Manuʻa	Taeaotui Punaofo Tilei	23	5.82
2 – Manuʻa	Saiaona'i T. Tuiolosega	20	5.06
3 – Vaifanua	Lavea Fatulegae'e Palepoi Mauga	408	65.91
3 – Vaifanua	Uta Dr. Laloulu Tagoilelagi	211	34.09
4 – Saole	Kitara Vaiau	169	36.19
4 – Saole	Talaimatai Elisara Su'a	117	25.05
4 – Saole	Va'asa Uluiva Simanu	111	23.77
4 – Saole	Manaea Fotu Leuta	70	14.99
5 – Sua #1	Puleleiite Li'a Tufele Jr.	161	31.08
5 – Sua #1	Tuialofi F. L. Tunupopo	149	28.76
5 – Sua #1	Uele Fale Savaliga Uele	118	22.78
5 – Sua #1	Ketesemane Meaole	90	17.37
6 – Sua #2	Matagi David Sialega Mauga	170	44.39
6 – Sua #2	Loia Gutu	110	28.72
6 – Sua #2	Limutau F.C. Limutau	76	19.84
6 – Sua #2	'Aulualo Folau Solofa Fatu	27	7.05
7 – Maoputasi #1	Vailoata Eteuati Amituana'i	332	68.74
7 – Maoputasi #1	Salote Lutu Schuster	151	31.26
8 – Maoputasi #2	Vailiuama Steve Leasiolagi	224	46.47
8 – Maoputasi #2	Maugaoalii Le'apai Sipa Anoa'i	223	46.27
8 – Maoputasi #2	Ta'amuolevaigafa Iakope Ta'amu	35	7.26
9 – Maoputasi #3	Ve'evalu Meauta Lauoi Mageo	287	35.21
9 – Maoputasi #3	Fiasili Puni E. Haleck	267	32.76
9 – Maoputasi #3	Pago Pagoa Freddy T. Malala	135	16.56
9 – Maoputasi #3	Utaifeau Lefiu Bill Kalasa	126	15.46
10 – Maoputasi #4	Vaetasi Tu'umolimoli S. Moliga	148	53.24
10 – Maoputasi #4	Fatima Faumuina Langkilde	81	29.14
10 – Maoputasi #4	Tapai Alailepule Benjamin Vaivao	49	17.63
11 – Maoputasi #5	Faimealelei Anthony Fu'e Allen	220	46.51
11 – Maoputasi #5	Barbara Pelina Fesilafa'i Salima	136	28.75
11 – Maoputasi #5	Muaiavaona Fofoga Pila	117	24.74
12 – Ituau	Manumaua Wayne Wilson	1,037	41.90
12 – Ituau	Sataua Dr. Mataese Samuelu	766	30.95
12 – Ituau	Vaiaitu Mulinu'u Filo T Maluia	672	27.15
13 – Fofo	Fagaoatua Dorian T. Salave'a	348	37.74
13 – Fofo	Andra Tereise Samoa	290	31.45
13 – Fofo	Puletu D. Koko	284	30.80
14 – Lealataua	Savali Talavou Ale	408	100
15 – Tualauta	Samuel Ioka Ale Meleisea	978	23.29
15 – Tualauta	Vui Florence Tuāumu Saulo	760	18.10
15 – Tualauta	Tapumanaia Galu Satele Jr.	754	17.96
15 – Tualauta	Ryan A. Peau	526	12.53
15 – Tualauta	Ufuti Fa'afetai Ieremia	522	12.43
15 – Tualauta	Bartley Lucia Su'a	386	9.19
15 – Tualauta	Saipai Cassens	148	3.52
15 – Tualauta	Leomiti Faitamai Leomiti	125	2.98
16 – Tualatai	Timusa Tini C. Lam Yuen	278	38.45
16 – Tualatai	Manavaalofa Tutuila Manase	206	28.49
16 – Tualatai	Galumalemana Bill Satele	108	14.94
16 – Tualatai	Nu'u Lefanoga Eseroma	81	11.20
16 – Tualatai	Taumanupepe Fm Hunkin Seumanu	44	6.09
16 – Tualatai	Fauolevavau Lopati Tuatagaloa	6	0.83
17 – Leasina	Gafatasi Afalava	272	60.04
17 – Leasina	Atalina Asifoa	132	29.14
17 – Leasina	Maneafaiga T. Faoa	49	10.82
Source: Election Office
