= Afoa Moega Lutu =

American Samoan politician

Afoa Lutu
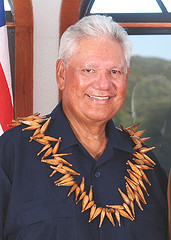

Attorney General of American Samoa
- In office January 3, 2013 – January 1, 2014
- Governor: Lolo Matalasi Moliga
- Preceded by: Afa Ripley Jr.
- Succeeded by: Eleasalo Ale
- In office January 3, 1985 – January 2, 1989
- Governor: A. P. Lutali
- Preceded by: Tautai Aviata Faʻalevao
- Succeeded by: Tautai Aviata Faʻalevao

Member of the American Samoa Senate from the Maʻopūtasi County district
- In office January 2015 – January 2021
- Preceded by: Mano Fa'agata
- Succeeded by: Fano Shimasaki

Member of the American Samoa House of Representatives from the Maʻopūtasi County district
- In office January 1993 – January 1997

Personal details
- Born: Afoafouvale Leulumoegafou Suʻesuʻe Lutu; February 24, 1947 Leulumoega, Samoa
- Died: December 15, 2023 (aged 76) Loma Linda, California, U.S.
- Party: Republican
- Education: Truman State University (attended); University of Hawaii, Manoa (BA); Valparaiso University (JD)

Afoafouvale Leulumoegafou Suʻesuʻe Lutu (February 24, 1947 – December 15, 2023) was an American Samoan politician and attorney. Lutu has served as the former attorney general of American Samoa in two different administrations. He was a former senator from the district of Maʻopūtasi, serving the villages of Fagatogo, Utulei and Fagaʻalu. He was the last known holder of the high chief title, Afoafouvale.

== Biography ==
=== Early life ===
Afoa Moega Lutu was born on February 24, 1947, to Rev. Suʻesuʻe Solofa Lutu and Vaituʻutuʻu Pātu Leota Leuluaʻialiʻi Lutu. He is the fourth of twelve children in his family. Lutu's parents taught at the theological school of the Congregational Christian Church in Samoa in Leulumoegafou, Western Samoa, now the independent nation of Samoa. Lutu's family moved back to American Samoa when he was less than a year old and settled in the village of Amanave, where his parents worked as Christian ministers.

=== Education ===
Lutu originally attended St. Theresa Elementary School in Leone, American Samoa. However, his parents moved again to the towns of Fagatogo and Utulei by the time he was six years old to live with extended family. He was selected to attend the Feleti Memorial Barstow Foundation Demonstration School for first to eighth grade.

He became salutatorian of his eighth grade class upon graduating from the school. Lutu next entered the High School of American Samoa. While in high school, his parents relocated to the village of Lauliʻi, east of Pago Pago Harbor, to work as ministers in the village. He resided with his grandparents, Rev. Suʻesuʻe and Sola, in Utulei during the school week, and traveled to see his parents on the weekend. Lutu graduated as student body president from high school in 1965. This was the last class of the original sole high school for the Territory before other high schools were formed elsewhere such as in the villages of Taʻu, Manuʻa, Leone and Fagaʻitua. Following his graduation, Lutu was one of four American Samoa students chosen for a cultural exchange program in the United States. Lutu moved to Spirit Lake, Iowa, to attend an extra year of high school as part of the cultural exchange. While in Iowa, he stayed at the home of Berkley and Elinor Bedell and their family. Berkley Bedell, Iowan businessman, was later elected as a United States Congressman (1975–1987).

Lutu attended Northeast Missouri State University, now known as Truman State University, on a full American Samoa Government scholarship. Lutu met his future wife while at Northeast Missouri, Etenauga Alvina Lam Yuen. Etenauga, whose parents were Pastor Tini Inu Lam Yuen and Tululautu Fueainaula Tagaloa Lam Yuen, was also from a large Samoan family of 10 siblings.

He transferred to University of Hawaiʻi at Mānoa after two years in Missouri to be closer to his parents, who were working as ministers for the First Samoan Congregational Church in Nānākuli, Hawaiʻi, at the time. He graduated from the University of Hawaiʻi at Mānoa in 1971 with a bachelor's degree in political science and a minor in prelaw. His wife, Etenauga, received her bachelor's degree in nursing from Walla Walla College, now Walla Walla University. Lutu enrolled in the Valparaiso University School of Law with another American Samoa Government scholarship.

Lutu and Etenauga married in Lynwood, California, in 1972. The couple relocated to Valparaiso, Indiana, where Lutu completed his Juris Doctor degree from Valporaiso University School of Law. Their first child, Christinna Sola, was born in Indianapolis, IN. The couple moved to Hawaii following Lutu's completion of law school in 1974.

The couple had several more children, including Alvina Lore, Faauuga Hannacho, Elinor Matuaifaleese, Justin Fouvale, Kimberly Malaeimi, Florence-Emma Leʻala, Joshua Simanualiʻi, Berkley LeAloalii and Bedell-Macready Tamaalemalo.

In 1989, the four Afoafouvale clans of American Samoa, namely Loʻi, Puaʻa, Taeletoto, and Tuālima, bestowed the title of Afoafouvale to him. He was formally granted in a traditional ceremony in 1990 at the Afoa family land, Asila. This marked the first time the title of Afoafouvale was held by anyone since the mid 1970s.

== Career ==
The family returned to American Samoa in 1975 where Lutu worked as an attorney-at-law, until he retired from private practice in 2012. They eventually settled in Taputimu and Utulei, American Samoa.

Lutu was appointed Attorney General of American Samoa by the late Governor A. P. Lutali after he was elected governor in 1985. He represented American Samoa and the Lutali administration at the early South Pacific Tuna Treaty negotiations. As attorney general, Lutu also successfully defended challenges to the traditional Samoan communal land system before United States federal courts and the United States Supreme Court.

He next became the special legal counsel for the President of the American Samoa Senate from 1998 until 1992. Lutu was elected to the American Samoa House of Representatives for Maʻopūtasi District No. 7 in 1992. He spent two terms, a total of four years, in the House before leaving his seat to become legal counsel to the American Samoa House of Representatives from 1996 until 1997.

Lutu next served as the head of the Legislative Reference Bureau from 1997 until 2004.

On June 18, 2010, a Constitutional Convention for the Territory was called for by then Governor Togiola Tulafono, to consider proposals to amend the constitution document, which was last formally reviewed in 1987 (American Samoa Government Executive Order No. 005-2010). Lutu was appointed the Director of proceedings for the 2010 convention, which took place from June 21 through July 2, 2010. He was also a panel member for the 1987 Constitutional Convention.

In 2012, Lutu was again appointed attorney general during the Lolo Matalasi Moliga administration. He was the first appointed cabinet member for the new administration.

In 2014, he stepped down as attorney general to serve his district of Maʻopūtasi No. 7 as senator at the request of the District, representing the villages of Fagatogo, Utulei and Fagaʻalu.

=== Political ambitions ===
In 1990 Lutu ran for the American Samoa Delegates in the United States House of Representatives, but was defeated by Eni Faleomavaega.

Lutu campaigned as the running mate for Lieutenant Governor of American Samoa with Senator Lealaifuaneva Peter Reid for Governor during the 1996 and 2000 American Samoan gubernatorial elections. However, Reid and Lutu lost both elections. They were defeated by former governor Tauese Sunia and then Lt. Governor Tulafono in both 1996 and 2000.

In 2004 Lutu ran for Governor of American Samoa in 2004 with Taeaoafua Dr. Meki Solomona as his running mate. The two faced incumbent Governor Togiola Tulafono and Lt. Governor Ipulasi Aitofele Sunia in the 2004 general election. However, Tulafono defeated Lutu in the second round runoff election. Tulafono earned 56 percent of the vote while Lutu garnered 44 percent.

In 2008 Lutu ran again for the gubernatorial seat for American Samoa with then Senator Velega Savali. They did not make the run-off election and endorsed the Togiola Tulafono/Aitofele Sunia team during the final election, which they won beating the Utu Abe Malae/Sao Nua team.

In 2012 Lutu made a final bid for the gubernatorial seat with teammate Leʻi Sonny Thompson. They were unable to meet the needed votes for the run-off election.

=== 2008 gubernatorial election ===
Afoa Moega Lutu once again decided to challenge Gov. Togiola Tulafono for his office in the 2008 gubernatorial election. Lutu's running mate for Lieutenant Governor was Velega Savali, a former American Samoan Treasurer.

Lutu and Savali launched their campaign for Governor at a kick-off campaign rally at the Tradewinds Hotel on May 17, 2008. Approximately 700 people attended the rally. Lutu promised to run on issues such as transparency and improving the territory's public education system.

The gubernatorial election took place on November 4, 2008, and Tulafono was re-elected.

== Alzheimer's disease ==
In November 2019, the Lutu family publicly made known Afoa's battle with Alzheimer's disease. An "Unforgettable Walk" was held in participation of the National Alzheimer's Disease Awareness Month and hosted by the non-profit Lutu co-founded, the Agency for Better Living Endeavors (A.B.L.E.). A.B.L.E. has partnered with other agencies, government and non-government, to promote awareness of the brain disease and impacts to Samoan families and communities.

He died on December 15, 2023, in Loma Linda, California.

Legal offices
Preceded by Tautai Aviata Faʻalevao	Attorney General of American Samoa; 1985–1989	Succeeded by Tautai Aviata Faʻalevao
Preceded by Afa Ripley Jr.	Attorney General of American Samoa; 2013–2014	Succeeded by Eleasalo Ale
Party political offices
Preceded by Peter Reid	Republican nominee for Governor of American Samoa; 2004	Succeeded by Utu Abe Malae
Preceded by Utu Abe Malae	Republican nominee for Governor of American Samoa; 2012	Succeeded by Tuika Tuika
