= 2012 American Samoan general election =

- Gubernatorial election
- November 6, 2012 (first round); November 20, 2012 (second round)
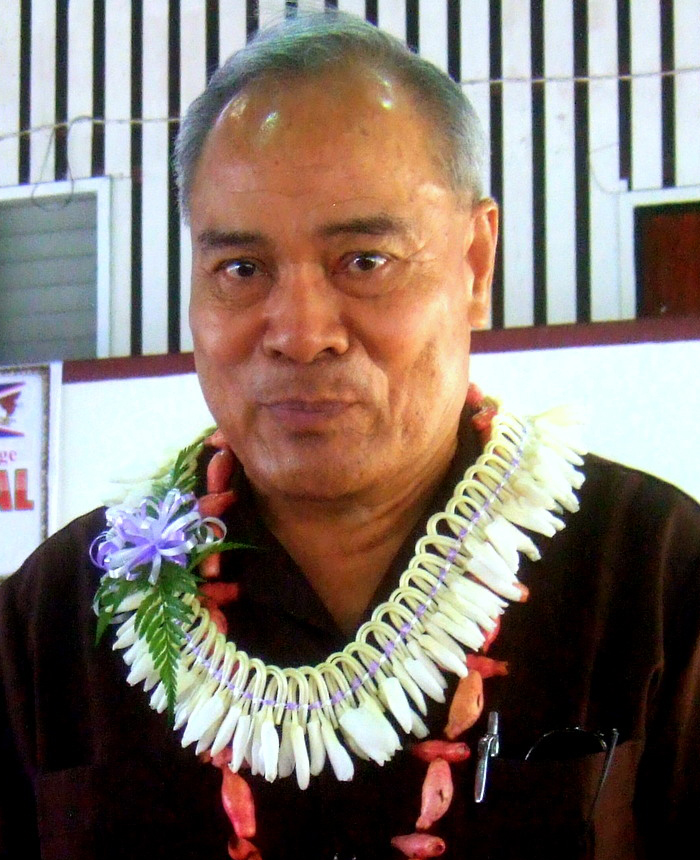

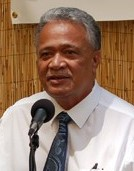
Nominee	Lolo Matalasi Moliga	Faoa Aitofele Sunia
Party	Independent	Independent
Alliance		Democratic
Running mate	Lemanu Peleti Mauga	Taufete'e John Faumuina, Jr.
Popular vote	6,645	5,908
Percentage	52.94%	47.06%
Governor before election
Togiola Tulafono
Elected Governor
Lolo Matalasi Moliga
- U.S. House delegate election
- November 6, 2012
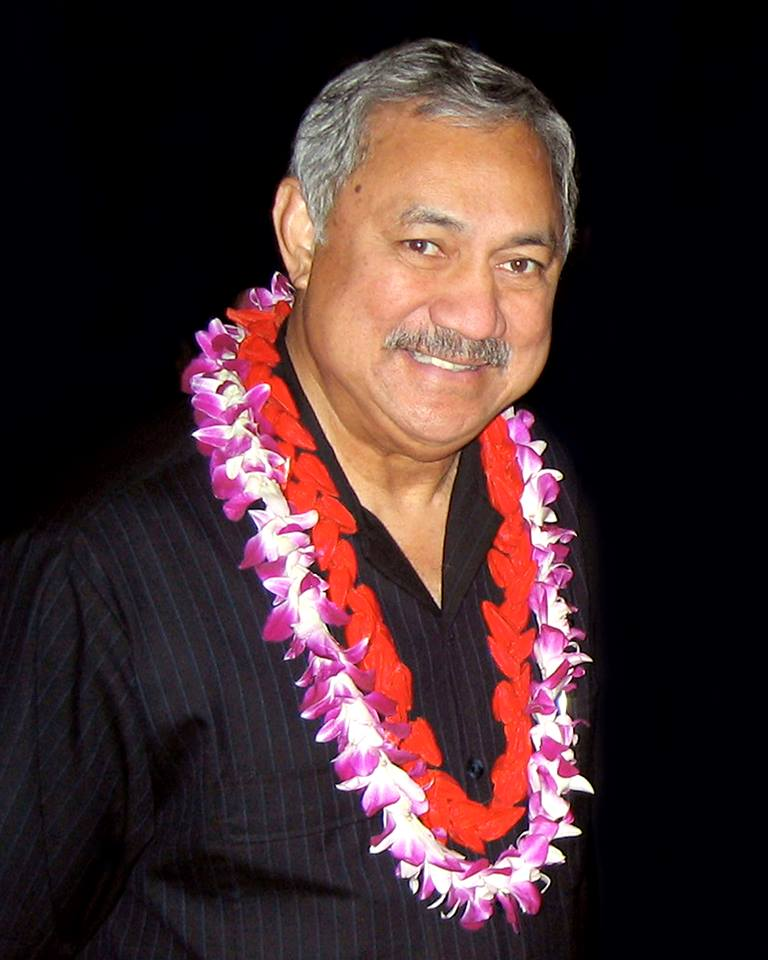

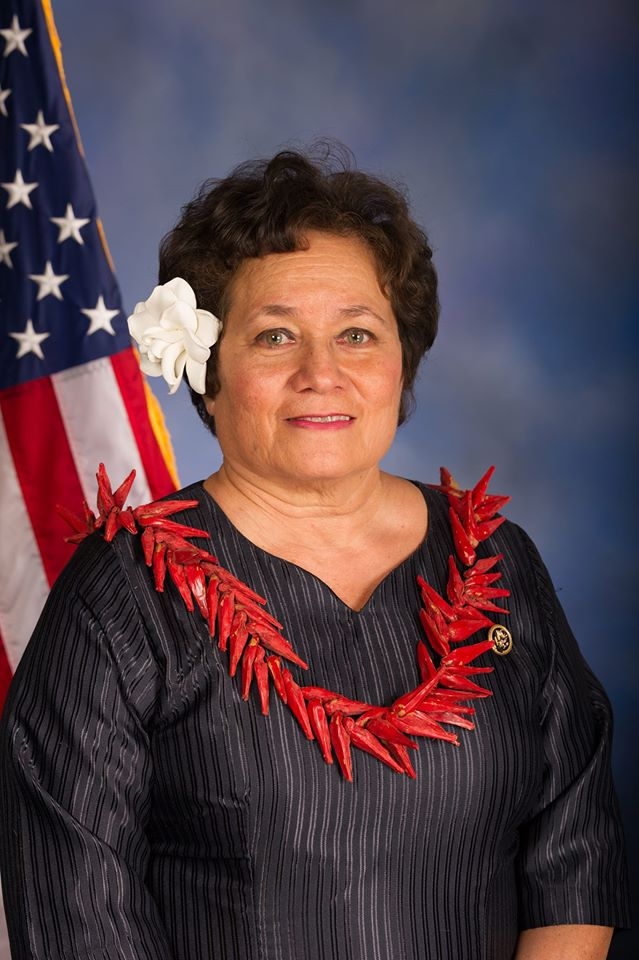
Candidate	Eni Faleomavaega	Amata Coleman Radewagen
Party	Democratic	Constitution
Popular vote	7,221	4,420
Percentage	55.22%	33.80%
Delegate before election
Eni Faleomavaega
Democratic
Elected Delegate
Eni Faleomavaega
Democratic

General elections were held in American Samoa on November 6, 2012, to elect a new governor and lieutenant governor, twenty members of the American Samoa House of Representatives and the Delegate to United States House of Representatives. Incumbent governor Togiola Tulafono was term-limited and could not seek re-election.

Lolo Matalasi Moliga was elected governor, while Eni Faleomavaega was re-elected as the U.S. House delegate.

== Gubernatorial election ==
The incumbent, Governor Togiola Tulafono, who had held office since 2003, was term-limited and could not seek re-election. Tulafono, who took office after the death of former governor Tauese Sunia, was elected to his first four-year term in 2004 and re-elected in the 2008 gubernatorial election.

All elections and candidates in American Samoa are nonpartisan, though Faoa Aitofele Sunia is affiliated with the Democratic Party. Slightly less than 17,000 American Samoans were eligible to vote in the 2012 election.

=== Candidates ===
Six candidates sought election as the next Governor of American Samoa in 2012. Governor Togiola Tulafono was term-limited and could not seek a third consecutive term.

- Salu Hunkin-Finau, educator and former president of the American Samoa Community College. Only female candidate for governor.
  - Running mate: Iuniasolua Savusa, former Command Sergeant Major in the United States Army
- Timothy Jones, businessman
  - Running mate: Tuika Tuika, government official and candidate for governor in 2008
- Afoa Moega Lutu, High Chief of Utulei, former attorney general, and candidate for governor in 2008
  - Running mate: Le'i Sonny Thompson, director of the Department of Administrative Services
- Lolo Letalu Matalasi Moliga, president of the Development Bank of American Samoa
  - Running mate: Lemanu Peleti Mauga, territorial Senator
- Faoa Aitofele Sunia, Lieutenant Governor of American Samoa since 2003, affiliated with the Democratic Party
  - Running mate: Taufete'e John Faumuina, Jr., former director of Economic Development
- Save Liuato Afa Tuitele, former judge of the High Court of American Samoa
  - Running mate: Tofoitaufa Sandra King-Young, founder and CEO of the Pacific Islands Center for Educational Development

==== Withdrawn candidates ====
- Utu Abe Malae, director of the Northern Marianas Commonwealth Utility Corporation and second placed candidate in 2008 gubernatorial election; announced candidacy on August 15, 2011, withdrew on October 10, 2011

=== Controversy ===
The gubernatorial ticket of Save Liuato Tuitele and Sandra King-Young filed a petition in September 2012 against four other campaigns questioning their eligibility to run in the election. Tuitele and Young argued that the other four candidates had not resigned from their government jobs before beginning their political campaigns, as required by law. The four candidates challenged by the Tuitele campaign were gubernatorial candidates Lolo Letalu Matalasi Moliga and Salu Hunkin-Finau, as well as lieutenant governor candidates Taufete'e Faumuina Jr. and Le'i Sonny Thompson.

The case was heard by the High Court of American Samoa, which turned down the petition allowing all candidates to remain in the election.

=== Endorsements ===
Outgoing governor Togiola Tulafono endorsed his lieutenant governor, Faoa Aitofele Sunia, for governor in the six-way election.

== Referendum ==
Voters were asked "Should Article II, Sections 9 and 19 of the revised constitution of American Samoa be revised to give the Fono, rather than the Secretary for the U.S. Department of Interior, the power to override the Governors veto?"

The proposal would involve amending two parts of the constitution:

Section	Existing text	Proposed text
Chapter II article 9 section 3	Not later than 14 months after a bill has been vetoed by the governor, it may be passed over his veto by a two-thirds majority of the entire membership of each house at any session of the legislature, regular or special. A bill so repassed shall be represented to the governor for his approval. If he does not approve it within 15 days, he shall send it together with his comment thereon to the Secretary of the Interior. If the Secretary of the Interior approves it within 90 days after its receipt by him, it shall become a law; otherwise it shall not.	Not later than 14 months after a bill has been vetoed by the governor, it may be passed over his veto by a two-thirds majority of the entire membership of each House at any session of the legislature, regular or special. A bill so repassed shall become law 90 days after the adjournment of the session in which it was repassed.
Chapter II article 19	An act of the legislature required to be approved and approved by the governor only shall take effect no-sooner than 60 days from the end of the session at which the same shall have been passed while an act required to be approved by the Secretary of the Interior only after its veto by the governor and so approved shall take effect no sooner than 40 days after its return to the governor by the Secretary of the Interior. The foregoing is subject to the exception that in case of an emergency the act may take effect at an earlier date stated in the act provided that the emergency be declared in the preamble and in the body of the act.	An act of the legislature required to be approved and approved by the governor only shall take effect no-sooner than 60 days from the end of the session at which the same shall have been passed. The foregoing is subject to the exception that in case of an emergency the act may take effect at an earlier date stated in the act provided that the emergency be declared in the preamble and in the body of the act.

== Results ==
=== Governor ===
Candidate	Running mate	First round		Second round	
Candidate	Running mate	Votes	%	Votes	%
Lolo Matalasi Moliga	Lemanu Peleti Mauga	4,372	33.49	6,645	52.94
Faoa Aitofele Sunia	Taufete'e John Faumuina, Jr.	4,315	33.06	5,908	47.06
Afoa Moega Lutu	Le'i Sonny Thompson	2,521	19.31		
Salu Hunkin-Finau	Iuniasolua Savusa	893	6.84		
Save Liuato Tuitele	Tofoitaufa Sandra King-Young	763	5.85		
Timothy Jones	Tuika Tuika	189	1.45		
Total		13,053	100.00	12,553	100.00
Source: Samoa News

=== U.S. House delegate ===
Candidate	Party	Votes	%
Eni Faleomavaega	Democratic Party	7,221	55.22
Amata Coleman Radewagen	Constitution Party	4,420	33.80
Rosie F. Tago Lancaster	Independent	697	5.33
Kereti Mata'utia Jr.	Democratic Party	438	3.35
Fatumalala Leulua'iali'i A. Al-Sheri	Independent	300	2.29
Total		13,076	100.00
Source: Federal Election Commission

=== Referendum ===
Choice	Votes	%
For	5,852	44.92
Against	7,177	55.08
Total	13,029	100.00
Registered voters/turnout	17,774	–
Source: Direct Democracy
