= Lolo Matalasi Moliga =

American Samoan politician (1947–2026)

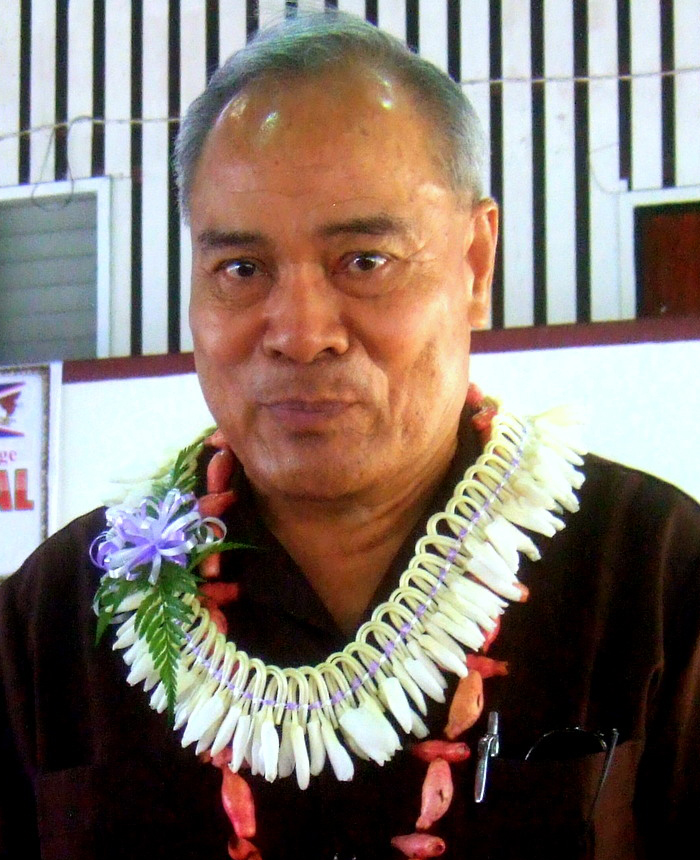
- Moliga in 2012

7th Governor of American Samoa
- In office January 3, 2013 – January 3, 2021
- Lieutenant: Peleti Mauga
- Preceded by: Togiola Tulafono
- Succeeded by: Peleti Mauga

Personal details
- Born: August 12, 1947 Taʻū, American Samoa, U.S.
- Died: March 6, 2026 (aged 78) Honolulu, Hawaii, U.S.
- Party: Democratic (before 2011, 2016–2026); Independent (2011–2015)
- Spouse: Cynthia Malala
- Education: Chadron State College (BA); San Diego State University (MPA)
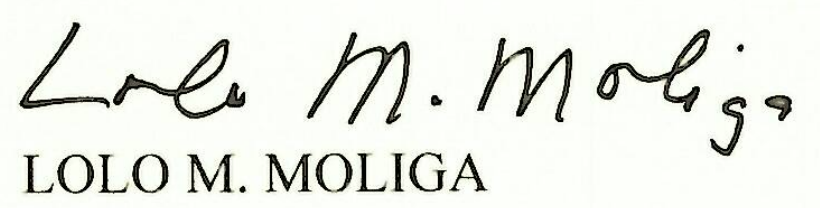
- Signature

Lolo Letalu Matalasi (August 12, 1947 – March 6, 2026) was an American Samoan politician, educator and businessman. He served as the seventh governor of American Samoa, from 2013 to 2021.

== Early life and education ==
Moliga was born in Taʻū, Manu'a, American Samoa, on August 12, 1947. His father was High Chief Moliga Sa'ena Aunuua Moliga, who was from Ta'u. His mother, Soali’i Galea’i, was a native of both Fitiuta and Olosega. He attended Papatea Junior Elementary and attended Samoana High School before graduating from Manu'a High School. Moliga held a bachelor's degree in education from Chadron State College in Nebraska. He received a master's degree in public administration from San Diego State University on July 30, 2012.

== Career ==
Moliga began his career as a teacher. He then became an elementary school principal before becoming the principal of Manu'a High School in the Manu'a Islands. He would later become an elementary and secondary education administrator within the American Samoan Department of Education. He also served as director of the ASG Budget Office, as well as American Samoa's chief procurement officer for two terms. Outside of public office, Moliga owned a construction firm.

=== Politics ===
Moliga was elected to the American Samoa House of Representatives for four terms. He later became a Senator within the American Samoa Senate, where he served as the body's senate president from 2005 until 2008. Moliga, while still a member of the Senate, considered a candidacy in the 2008 gubernatorial election, but withdrew from the race before announcing a potential running mate, citing existing commitments.

He was appointed president of the Development Bank of American Samoa by Governor Togiola Tulafono and confirmed by the Senate.

==== 2012 gubernatorial election ====
In October 2011, Moliga became the second candidate to declare his intention to run in the 2012 gubernatorial election. He chose Senator Lemanu Peleti Mauga as his running mate for Lieutenant Governor of American Samoa. Mauga, a retired member of the U.S. Army, served as the chairman of both the Budget and Appropriations Committee and the Senate Homeland Security Committee in the American Samoan Senate.

Moliga resigned as the president of the Development Bank of American Samoa (DBAS) to focus on his gubernatorial campaign.

He faced five other candidates in the 2012 gubernatorial election on November 6, 2012 and received the most votes, but not more than the 50% required to win. The runoff was held November 20, 2012, resulting in Moliga defeating Lieutenant Governor Faoa Aitofele Sunia.

==== 2016 gubernatorial election ====
Moliga won re-election on November 8, 2016, with 60.2% of the vote, defeating Faoa Aitofele Sunia and Tuika Tuika.

==== COVID-19 pandemic ====
On March 16, 2020, Moliga went into voluntary self-isolation in response to the COVID-19 pandemic. Moliga had previously traveled to Seattle and Hawaii, which had experienced cases of COVID-19.

==== Democratic National Convention ====
The United States Department of Defense is investigating two masked, uniformed soldiers who joined Moliga when he appeared online during the 2020 Democratic National Convention because uniformed soldiers are not permitted to participate in partisan events.

==== Death ====
Moliga died in Honolulu, Hawaii, on March 6, 2026, at the age of 78. Many released statements, including Congresswoman Amata Coleman Radewagen.

Political offices
Preceded by Togiola Tulafono	Governor of American Samoa; 2013–2021	Succeeded by Peleti Mauga
Party political offices
Preceded by Faoa Aitofele Sunia	Democratic nominee for Governor of American Samoa; 2016	Succeeded by Peleti Mauga
