= Tee Masaniai =

Recipient of the Purple Heart medal

Te’e Masaniai Jr. is an American Samoan politician and United States military retiree, Vietnam War veteran and Purple Heart recipient.

Masaniai was a candidate for Lieutenant Governor of American Samoa in the 2008 gubernatorial election, as the running mate of gubernatorial candidate Tuika Tuika. The ticket received just 0.51 per cent of the popular vote.

== Early life ==
Masaniai served in the United States Army 1966-1968 and the United States Marines Corps 1968–1972. He served in Vietnam in the Vietnam War in 1966-1967 and 1969–1970.

== See also ==
- 2008 American Samoa gubernatorial election
