= Velega Savali =

American Samoan politician (born 1943)

- Born: January 11, 1943 (age 83); American Samoa
- Occupations: Lawyer and politician
- Spouse: Leleiga Fa’atili Esera

Velega Savali Savali Jr. (born January 11, 1943) is an American Samoan politician. Savali was a candidate for Lieutenant Governor of American Samoa in the American Samoan gubernatorial election in 2008. He served as the American Samoa Treasurer from 2005 until 2008, and a senator from 2009 to 2012.

== Biography ==
=== Personal life ===
Savali is married to Leleiga Fa’atili Esera. The couple have three daughters - Lelatasi, Hope and Tasi - two sons, John and Savali III, and six grandchildren, Anthony, Lela, Walker, Dash, Reid and Maliyah.

Savali was granted the title of High Talking Chief of Velega by his family. He is a deacon at the Congregational Christian Church of American Samoa.

=== Early life ===
Savali was born on January 11, 1943, to Savali Rapi Muasau and Taupuleesea Tela. Savali's family is originally from Ofu-Olosega in the Manu'a Islands.

He attended Ofu Elementary School from 1948 and Papatea Junior High School from 1954. Savali moved to the island of Tutuila in 1958, where he attended the High School of American Samoa in Utulei. He and his family soon moved again, this time to Hawaii, where he graduated from Admiral Arthur W. Radford High School in 1962.

Savali enlisted in the United States Marines in 1965, and served in the Vietnam War for a brief time. He was awarded the Vietnam Service Medal, the National Defense Service Medal and two medals for good conduct. Seveli received an honorable discharge from the Marines in 1968 as an E-5.

Savali enrolled at Los Angeles City College in 1969. He transferred to California State University, Los Angeles, in 1971, where he earned a Bachelor of Science degree in political science and business administration.

=== Career ===
Savali returned to American Samoa in 1974, where he became the assistant director of the Department of Public Works (DPW). He became the manager of the Office of Motor Vehicles of American Samoa in 1975. He held the position until he took a position as the administrator of the High Court of American Samoa in 1978. Savali later became the manager of the Department of Human Resources.

Savali became a legislative financial officer for the American Samoa Fono in 1986. He was appointed as the vice president of the Development Bank of American Samoa in 2000.

Savali was appointed the Treasurer of the American Samoa government, a cabinet post, in August 2005 by Governor Togiola Tulafono. He was confirmed for the post by the American Samoa Fono. In January 2008, Governor Tulafono wrote to Savali asking that he submit his resignation for failing to report that the government was facing a deteriorating financial crisis and was running out of money. Savali sent a letter back to the Governor refusing to resign and challenging the governor to remove him from his cabinet office. He was subsequently fired by Governor Tulafono. Savali said in an interview that a termination letter was delivered to him in a public park. He stated that the Governor's poor assessment of the American Samoan finances was incorrect.

=== 2008 Lieutenant Governor election ===
In 2008, Afoa Moega Lutu announced that he would challenge Governor Togiola Tulafono for governor of American Samoa, with Velega Savali as his running mate. Savali would have become the next Lieutenant Governor of American Samoa if elected on November 4, 2008, but the Lutu-Savali ticket lost to the incumbent Governor Togiola Tulafono in a run off.

=== Senator ===
In January 2009 Savali joined the American Samoa Senate after a contested selection. In July 2010 he filed a lawsuit preventing the government spending money on a Samoan Heritage Week in Hawaii without the approval of the Fono.

He was subsequently appointed American Samoa's chief election officer, but resigned in May 2013.
