= Utu Abe Malae =

American Samoan politician

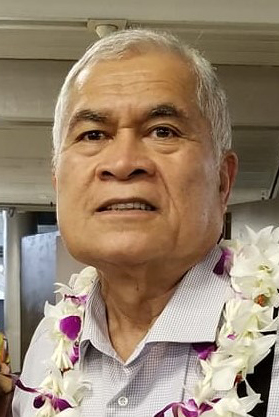

Chair of the American Samoa Republican Party
- In office March 19, 2016 – October 2, 2018
- Preceded by: Victor Tofaeono
- Succeeded by: William Sword

Personal details
- Born: 1952 or 1953
- Died: October 2, 2018 (aged 65) Fagaʻalu, American Samoa, U.S.
- Party: Republican
- Education: Morningside College (BS); Iowa State University (MS); University of Pittsburgh (MS)

Utu Abe Malae (died October 2, 2018) was an American Samoan politician, banker and businessman. A long-time leader of the American Samoa Power Authority, he served in the American Samoa Senate, and was a candidate for Governor of American Samoa in the 2008 gubernatorial elections, finishing second in the runoff to incumbent Governor Togiola Tulafono.

== Personal life ==
Utu Abe Malae's family and ancestry is originally from the Manu'a Islands,(his father's side) which are located approximately 70 miles east of American Samoa main island, Tutuila. His mother's family is from the village of Amouli, American Samoa. He was the fifth of seven children born to the late Elder Pita Malae and the late Fiapa'ipa'i Sera Utu Malae.

Malae received his bachelor's degrees in both chemistry and English in 1970 from Morningside College in Sioux City, Iowa. He went on to earn his first master's degree in physical chemistry from Iowa State University's School of Science & Technology in 1973. He next obtained two separate master's degrees in both public works administration and civil engineering from the University of Pittsburgh in Pennsylvania.

Malae was bestowed the Samoan chiefly title of Utu by his family in the early 2000s. Malae also served in the American Samoa Senate for Sa'Ole County.

Utu Abe Malae died on October 2, 2018, at the LBJ Tropical Medical Center in Faga'alu, American Samoa.

== Career ==
Malae worked within the government of American Samoa for over twenty-five years. He served as the executive director of the American Samoa Power Authority (ASPA), a government electric utility. He was appointed to oversee both the LBJ Medical Center and the Port Administration by separate American Samoan governors while he headed the ASPA.

Utu served as the CEO for the LBJ Medical Center from November 1995 to January 1997.

In April 2001, Malae was named one of the "Top Ten Public Works Leaders of the Year" by the American Public Works Association.

Malae, the American Samoa Power Authority and several other employees of the ASPA were also honored at the Mayors' Asia-Pacific Environment Summit 2001 in Honolulu, Hawaii. The summit was sponsored by the Asian Development Bank. Before the Summit, Malae presented then Honolulu Mayor Jeremy Harris with detailed accomplishments of ways in which the ASPA, under his directorship, had worked to combat environmental problems in American Samoa and elsewhere in the Pacific. Malae had initially promised to combat environmental pollution at the first Asia-Pacific Environment Summit in 1999. For his work, Malae received one of the summit's awards and was asked to appear as one of its featured guest speakers. The award "honors Abe Malae and recognize the tangible progress of the municipality and people of the American Samoa Power Authority in fulfilling their sustainable development commitment declared." Malae and his management of the ASPA was particularly praised for its operations of a utility service located in Ebeye, Marshall Islands.

Malae became vice chairman of the Pacific Power Association in 2001 and later became the acting chairman of the PPA in 2002 following the resignation of the organization's representative from the Northern Marianas Islands. In 2002 Malae was chosen for a full two-year term as chairman of the Pacific Power Association while still working as the executive director of the American Samoa Power Authority.

Malae left the ASPA in September 2004 to become acting president of the Development Bank of American Samoa, a government-owned bank. He was retained again as President of the bank in September 2006. Malae received praise for his management of the bank, which included a "clean" audit of its finances in 2007. He remained as head of the bank until his resignation to run for governor in 2008.

Malae, a Republican, was one of two American Samoans of the committee which drafted the election platform for the 2008 Republican National Convention. Malae served as one of American Samoa's elected delegates who supported 2008 presidential nominee Senator John McCain, and represented the territory at the 2008 Republican National Convention in Saint Paul, Minnesota.

In August 2009 Utu resigned his position in the Senate to take up a role with the Northern Marianas Commonwealth Utility Corporation (CUC) in the Northern Mariana Islands. He was succeeded as Senator by Fuata Tanielu Iatala. He was appointed as executive director of the CUC in November 2010. On August 15, 2011, Malae announced his candidacy in the 2012 American Samoa gubernatorial election. However, Malae withdrew from the gubernatorial race on October 10, 2011, citing a need to continue his work as the executive director of the Northern Marianas Commonwealth Utility Corporation (CUC) in the Northern Mariana Islands. He was reappointed as ASPA chief executive in January 2013.

== 2008 gubernatorial candidacy ==
Utu Abe Malae announced the formation of an exploratory committee April 2008 to study the feasibility of a candidacy for Governor of American Samoa. The committee was made up of Malae's family, friends and supporters.

Malae fueled further speculation that he was planning a run for governor when he tendered his resignation as president of the Development Bank of American Samoa. He submitted a letter of resignation to the bank's board of directors on May 29, 2008. He left the bank on July 3.

Malae officially announced his candidacy on June 10, 2008, for Governor of American Samoa in the 2008 gubernatorial election. He chose Nua Mailo Saoluaga, a former Speaker of the American Samoa House of Representatives who is from Manu'a, as his running mate for lieutenant governor. Malae filed his petition to run for governor at the American Samoa Election Office at 9:00 A.M. on June 10. He held his official gubernatorial announcement at the Maliu Mai Beach Resort later in the day.

In his announcement, Malae promised to make healthcare and education a top priority in a future Malae administration. He referred to these as the top two issues facing American Samoa today.

Malae faced incumbent Gov. Togiola Tulafono and two other candidates in the gubernatorial election on November 4, 2008. Tulafono received 41.3% of the vote to Malae's 31.4%. Because no candidate received more than 50% of the vote, a run-off election between Malae and Tulafono took place on November 18, 2008. Governor Tulafono defeated Malae to win a second, four-year term.

== Chairmanship of the Republican Party of American Samoa ==
In March 2016, Malae was elected chairman of the Republican Party of American Samoa.

== Legacy ==
In March 2017 the Utu Seamount was named after him.

Party political offices
| Preceded by Afoa Moega Lutu | Republican nominee for Governor of American Samoa; 2008 | Succeeded by Afoa Moega Lutu |
| Preceded by Victor Tofaeono | Chair of the American Samoa Republican Party; 2016–2018 | Succeeded by William Sword |
