= 2000 American Samoan general election =

- November 7, 2000
- Gubernatorial election
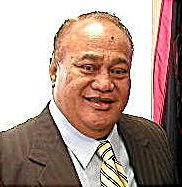

| Nominee | Tauese Sunia | L. Peter Reid |
| Party | Democratic | Independent |
| Popular vote | 6,110 | 5,769 |
| Percentage | 51.44% | 48.56% |
Governor before election
Tauese Sunia
Democratic
Elected Governor
Tauese Sunia
Democratic

General elections were held in American Samoa on November 7, 2000, to elect the Governor of American Samoa, members of the Fono and the congressional delegate. Incumbent governor, Tauese Sunia of the Democratic Party, was narrowly re-elected against Independent candidate Lealaifuaneva Peter Reid in a rematch of the previous election.

== Gubernatorial candidates ==
Rosalia Tisa Fa’amuli became the first woman to run for the office of Governor of American Samoa. She operated Tisa's Barefoot Bar, one of the most renowned establishments in Alega, and ran for governor as the Green Party's candidate.

== Results ==
=== Governor ===
Sunia won re-election by a margin of 341 votes against his opponent independent candidate L. Peter Reid, thereby holding Democratic control over the office of governor. Sunia was sworn in for his second term on January 3, 2001.

| Candidate | Party | Votes | % |
|---|---|---|---|
| Tauese Sunia | Democratic Party | 6,110 | 51.44 |
| L. Peter Reid | Independent | 5,769 | 48.56 |
| Total | | 11,879 | 100.00 |
Source: Saipan Tribune

== Aftermath ==
The election paralleled the contentious nature of the U.S. presidential race held the same year. Following the elections, Reid challenged the results, alleging that Chief Election Officer Soliai Tuipine Fuimaono committed errors that compromised the integrity of the election and left the outcome uncertain. Reid's legal challenge questioned the handling of the vote, suggesting that the process was susceptible to fraud. The case was brought before a five-judge panel of the High Court of American Samoa. In its decision, the court upheld Sunia's re-election, stating that Reid had failed to provide "clear and convincing evidence" sufficient to overturn the election results.
