= Arieta Enesi Mulitauaopele =

American Samoan nurse and politician

Arieta Enesi Mulitauaopele (21 February 1923 – 5 February 1990) was an American Samoan nurse and politician, who was the first Samoan to work as Chief Public Health Nurse in American Samoa, and was the first Samoan woman to run for election as Lieutenant Governor of American Samoa.

== Early life and education ==
Arieta Enesi was born on 21 February 1923 to parents Niko, the first pastor in Utulei, and Seine, a housewife. She was the fifth of eight children. She attended Poyer High School, and then in 1939 began to train as a nurse. After four years she graduated and was appointed Nurse Supervisor to the maternity ward at the American Samoa Hospital. In 1946 she continued her nursing training in Honolulu, where she's worked at the Queen's Hospital and at Kapiolani Maternity Hospital.

== Career ==
In 1948 Mulitauaopele returned to American Samoa in order to start training nurses herself. In 1952 she was promoted to Assistant Chief Nurse of the American Samoa Hospital. In 1956 she promoted to Chief Public Health Nurse and was the first Samoan to hold the post. During her time as Chief Public Health Nurse, Mulitauaopele initiated a campaign to increase public health services across the islands. She established a team of 960 women, who formed a Tumuma, or Women's Health Organisation, which encouraged preventative health measures, hygiene and nutrition across the territory. As a member of the Women's Health Committee, Mulitauaopele initiated a cancer detection programme across all the territory. She also worked as Associate Health Planner and was instrumental in the enabling the first study on Samoan medicinal plants to take place.

In 1962 Mulitauaopele was one of two delegates to attend the South Pacific Commission's conference, which was held in Pago Pago. In 1977 she was one of a number of delegates from American Samoa to attend the first Women's National Conference. She was President of a number of societies, including: the Nurses' Alumni Association, the Pan Pacific Southeast Women's Association, the American Samoa Cancer Society, the Women's Health Organization, and the Church Women's Fellowship Council.

In 1977 Mulitauaopele retired from the Department of Health in order to run for election in American Samoa's first gubernatorial election. Whilst unsuccessful, she was the first Samoan woman to run for election to high office as Lieutenant Governor of American Samoa.

== Personal life ==
In 1945 she married Chief Tamotu Mulitauaopele. They had seven children: four boys and three girls.
