= Tuika Tuika =

American Samoa politician

Tuika Tuika is an American Samoan politician and former member of the American Samoa Fono.

Tuika has worked as an accountant in the Territorial Audit Office and Tax office, as a teacher at the American Samoa Community College, and as a political staffer. He was elected to the American Samoa House of Representatives in 1985.

Tuika ran as a candidate for Governor of American Samoa in the 2008 gubernatorial election. His running mate for Lieutenant Governor was Tee Masaniai. The ticket received just 0.51 per cent of the popular vote.

Tuika announced his candidacy for Delegate to the U.S. House of Representatives in the 2010 election for United States House of Representatives election in American Samoa, but placed third behind incumbent Rep. Eni Faleomavaega.

He ran again for lieutenant governor in 2012, for governor in 2016, and for Congressional Delegate in 2014 and 2018.

== See also ==
- 2008 American Samoa gubernatorial election

Party political offices
| Preceded by Afoa Moega Lutu | Republican nominee for Governor of American Samoa; 2016 | Succeeded by Nua Saoluaga |
