= Tauese Sunia =

American politician

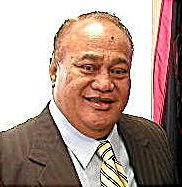

5th Governor of American Samoa
- In office January 3, 1997 – March 26, 2003
- Lieutenant: Togiola Tulafono
- Preceded by: A. P. Lutali
- Succeeded by: Togiola Tulafono

6th Lieutenant Governor of American Samoa
- In office January 4, 1993 – January 3, 1997
- Governor: A. P. Lutali
- Preceded by: Gaioi Tufele Galeai
- Succeeded by: Togiola Tulafono

Member of the American Samoa House of Representatives
- In office 1969–1970

Personal details
- Born: August 29, 1941 Fagatogo, American Samoa, U.S.
- Died: March 26, 2003 (aged 61) En route to Hawaii
- Party: Democratic
- Spouse: Fagaoalii Satele (1969–2003)
- Children: 10
- Education: University of Nebraska, Kearney (BA); University of Hawaii, Manoa (MA)

Tauese Tuailemafua Pita Fiti Sunia (August 29, 1941 – March 26, 2003) was an American Samoan politician who served as the fifth governor of American Samoa from 1997 until his death in 2003. He was the second governor of American Samoa to die in office; Warren Terhune was the first.

== Career ==
Sunia's career in public service began in the education sector, where he held various administrative roles, including Deputy Director of the American Samoa Department of Education from 1972 to 1974. In 1974, he became the first vice president of the newly established American Samoa Community College, and later served as the Director of the Department of Education from 1984 to 1988. His political career began in 1992 when he was elected as Lieutenant Governor on the Democratic ticket alongside A. P. Lutali.

Sunia was a member of the Democratic Party. He won the election of 1996 in a close runoff with Lealaifuaneva Peter Reid (51%-48%). The runoff was caused by a split in the Democratic Party in American Samoa between Sunia and incumbent governor Lutali Aifili Paulo Lauvao, who received third place, with no candidate gaining a majority. Sunia won another close victory against Reid in the 2000 election, 50%–48%, with no runoff. The results were contested by his opponent, Peter Reid, but were eventually upheld by the courts.

During Sunia's term of office a protest was issued against Samoa, formerly named Western Samoa, for changing its official name to the shorter form. The official view in American Samoa is that such a form detracts from the Samoan identity of American Samoa, and public officials and documents from American Samoa still refer to Samoa as "Western Samoa".

In 1997, he was awarded an honorary doctorate of humane letters by Golden Gate University.

== Personal life ==
Sunia married Fagaoalii Satele Sunia in 1969. They moved back to American Samoa in 1981 after living in Hawaii and settled in Leone, American Samoa.

Tauese Sunia graduated from Samoana High School and attended Kearney State Teachers' College in Nebraska, where he later taught. Returning to American Samoa in 1965, he taught Government and History at Leone High School and on television. In 1967, he was hired by the American Samoa Department of Education. From 1969-1970, he served one term in the American Samoa House of Representatives, representing the first district. In 1974, he assisted the President of the American Samoa Community College with its relocation from Utulei to Mapusagafou. In 1980, Sunia earned a master's degree from the University of Hawai'i. He returned to American Samoa to support A. P. Lutali's gubernatorial campaign and was subsequently appointed Director of Education by Governor Lutali. In 1992, he joined Lutali’s administration as Lieutenant Governor of American Samoa in 1993. Sunia was awarded the High Orator title Tauese of the village of Taʻū in 1984. He also served as chairman of the Annual General Assembly of the Christian Congregational Church in 1996, 1998, and 2000.

== Death ==
Sunia died during his second term, on March 26, 2003, while on a flight to Hawaii to receive medical treatment, becoming only the second governor of American Samoa (after Warren Terhune), and the first civilian one, to die in office. In 2012, the Utulei Convention Center was remodeled and renamed for Sunia. His wife, Fagaoalii Satele Sunia, died on September 5, 2015.

Political offices
Preceded by Gaioi Tufele Galeai	Lieutenant Governor of American Samoa; 1993–1997	Succeeded by Togiola Tulafono
Preceded by A.P. Lutali	Governor of American Samoa; 1997–2003	Succeeded by Togiola Tulafono
Party political offices
Preceded by A. P. Lutali	Democratic nominee for Governor of American Samoa; 1996, 2000	Succeeded by Togiola Tulafono
