= Faoa Aitofele Sunia =

American Samoan politician

Faoa Sunia
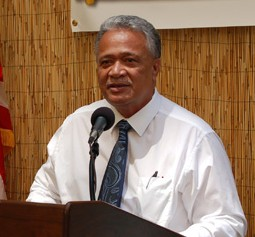

8th Lieutenant Governor of American Samoa
- In office April 11, 2003 – January 3, 2013
- Governor: Togiola Tulafono
- Preceded by: Togiola Tulafono
- Succeeded by: Lemanu Peleti Mauga

Personal details
- Born: Faoa Aitofele Toese Fiti Sunia; March 27, 1943 (age 83) Fagatogo, American Samoa
- Party: Democratic
- Spouse: Elisapeta Pula Nikolao Iuli
- Children: 7
- Education: Concord University (attended); San Francisco State University (attended); University of San Francisco (BS, JD)

Faoa Aitofele Toese Fiti Sunia (born March 27, 1943), formerly known by the title of Ipulasi Aitofele Sunia, is an American Samoan lawyer and politician. Sunia served as the eighth lieutenant governor of American Samoa from April 11, 2003 to January 3, 2013.

== Biography ==
=== Early life ===
Sunia was born on March 27, 1943, in Fagatogo, American Samoa. His parents were Elder Rev. Fiti and Savali Alesana Sunia. His father was a minister. Sunia was later adopted by Toese Namu Sagapolutele and Samanu Alo Sagapolutele.

Sunia was educated at Marist Elementary School, Feleti Memorial Demonstration Junior High School and Samoana High School. His family moved to Hawaii when he was a teenager, so Sunia graduated from President Theodore Roosevelt High School in Honolulu in 1962. Following his graduation from high school, Sunia attended Concord College, located in Athens, West Virginia, from 1962 until 1965.

=== Personal life ===
Sunia is married to Elisapeta Pula Nikolao Iuli. The couple have seven children and one grandchild. According to his official biography, Sunia is a member of the Lions Clubs International, Masons and the Shriners.

Sunia worked as a High Court of American Samoa court interpreter from 1965 until 1968. From 1968 until 1969, he was employed at the American Samoa Weather Station as a mediological(meteorological) technician.

He returned to college in 1970 and attended San Francisco State University. He transferred to the University of San Francisco in 1971 and 1972. Sunia graduated from the University of San Francisco in 1972 with a Bachelor of Science degree in government. He further enrolled in the University of San Francisco's law school, where he received a Juris Doctor in Law in 1975.

Sunia returned to American Samoa, where he took a position as the territory's Assistant Attorney General from 1976 until 1978. He became the legal counsel for the American Samoa Fono from 1979 to 1983, and later also served as legal counsel for the director for the Legislative Reference Bureau.

Sunia became a partner in a private law firm, Kruse, Sunia & Ward, from 1983 until 1988. He was elevated to judge pro-tem from 1986 until 1988. He returned to his former position as Assistant Attorney General from 1988 until 1992.

He was appointed the Treasurer of American Samoa from 1993 until 1994. In 1994, Sunia became the head legal counsel for the American Samoan Fono for a second time. He next became Treasurer again in 2001, where he remained until 2003.

Sunia further served on the Western Pacific Regional Fishery Management Council for six year.

=== Lieutenant governor ===
Sunia remained Treasurer until 2003. In 2003, Governor Togiola Tulafono selected Sunia as the new Lieutenant Governor of American Samoa. Tulafono, Sunia's predecessor as lieutenant governor, had become governor following the unexpected death of former Governor Tauese Sunia of a heart attack in March 2003 while en route to Honolulu for medical treatment. Ipulasi Sunia was the younger brother of the late Governor Tauese Sunia.

Sunia was sworn into office as Lieutenant Governor on Friday, April 11, 2003, after he was confirmed by the American Samoan legislature earlier the same day. The oath of office was administered by Territorial Chief Justice Michael Kruse.

Tulafono and Sunia were elected to a full term with 56% of the vote in 2004 following a run-off election.

Sunia and American Samoa Senator Tini Lam Yuen were arrested and indicted in September 2007 in a federal corruption probe for awarding local United States Department of Education contracts. The charges stemmed from when Sunia's tenure as the American Samoan Treasurer. The prosecution ended in a mistrial in 2010.

Governor Togiola Tulafono and Lieutenant Governor Ipulasi Aitofele Sunia announced their joint reelection campaign on May 10, 2008, at the Tradewinds Hotel in Tafuna. The 2008 American Samoa gubernatorial election took place on November 4, 2008.

Party political offices
Preceded by Togiola Tulafono	Democratic nominee for Lieutenant Governor of American Samoa; 2008	Succeeded by Taufetee John Faumuina
Preceded by Togiola Tulafono	Democratic nominee for Governor of American Samoa; 2012	Succeeded by Lolo Matalasi Moliga
Political offices
Preceded by Togiola Tulafono	Lieutenant Governor of American Samoa; 2009–2013	Succeeded by Lemanu Peleti Mauga
