= 2008 American Samoan general election =

- Gubernatorial election
- November 4, 2008 (first round); November 18, 2008 (second round)
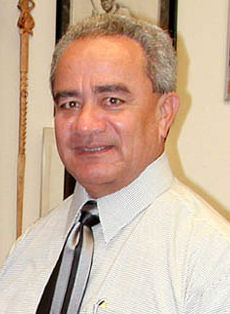

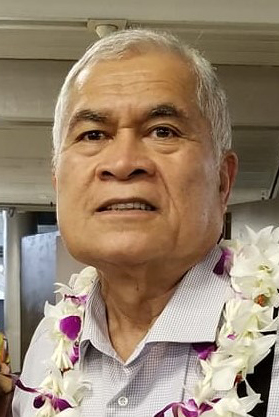
Nominee	Togiola Tulafono	Utu Abe Malae
Party	Democratic	Republican
Running mate	Ipulasi Aitofele Sunia	Nua Mailo Saoluaga
Popular vote	6,590	5,084
Percentage	56.45%	43.55%
Governor before election
Togiola Tulafono
Elected Governor
Togiola Tulafono
- U.S. House delegate election
- November 4, 2008
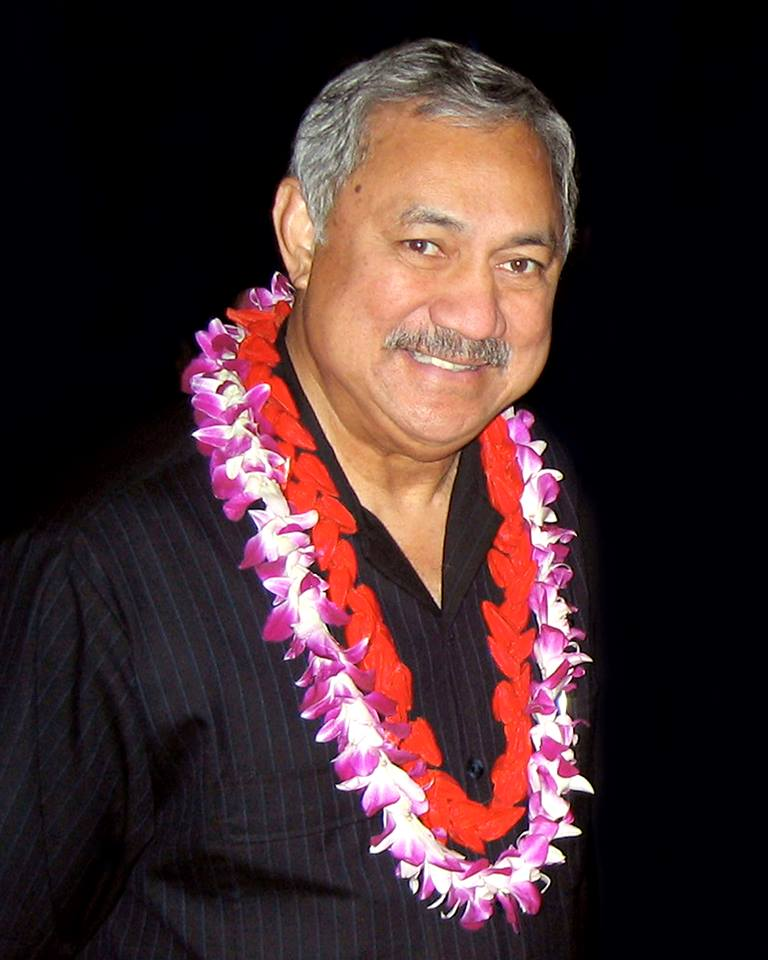

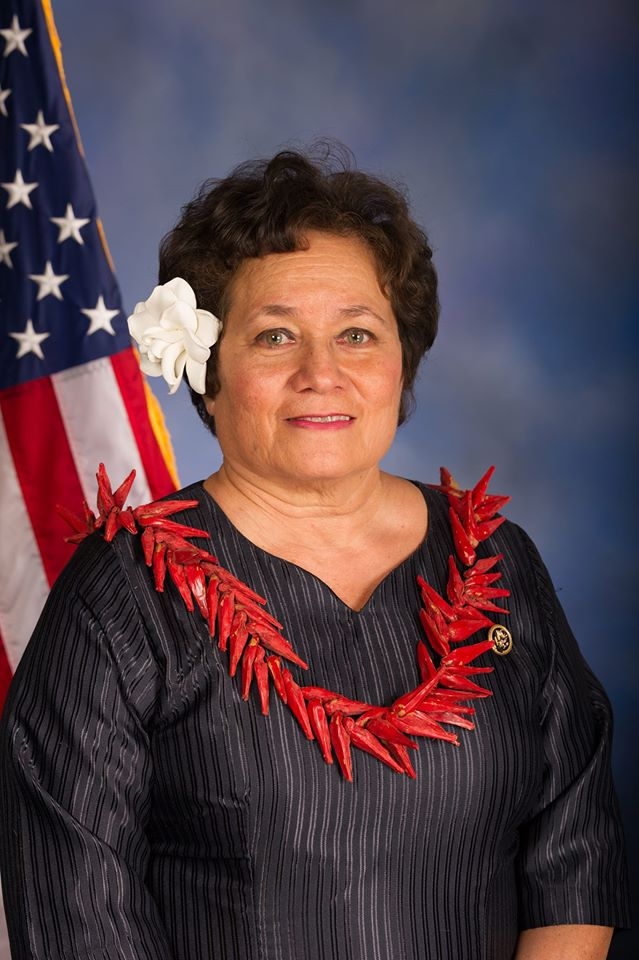
Candidate	Eni Faleomavaega	Amata Coleman Radewagen
Party	Democratic	Republican
Popular vote	7,498	4,349
Percentage	60.38%	35.02%
- Results by electoral district: Eni Faleomavaega: 45–50% 50–55% 55–60% 60–65% 65–70% 70–75% 80–85% Aumua Amata Coleman Radewagen: 50–55% 55–60%
Delegate before election
Eni Faleomavaega
Democratic
Elected Delegate
Eni Faleomavaega
Democratic

General elections were held in American Samoa on November 4, 2008, to elect a governor, members of the House of Representative, and a delegate to the United States House of Representatives, as well as a referendum on a legislative override of the governor's veto. The elections were held as part of the wider 2008 United States general election.

In the gubernatorial election no candidate received more than 50% of the vote in the first round, resulting in a runoff election between the top two candidates on November 18, which was won by the incumbent governor Togiola Tulafono.

Incumbent U.S. House delegate Eni Faleomavaega, who affiliates with the Democratic Party was also re-elected.

== Gubernatorial election ==
=== Background ===
Governor Togiola Tulafono and Lieutenant Governor Ipulasi Aitofele Sunia announced their intent to seek re-election on May 10, 2008. Their formal announcement, which Tulafono called "the worst kept secret of this season," took place before a crowd of approximately three hundred supporters at the Tradewinds Hotel in Tafuna.

Afoa Moega Lutu formally announced his own candidacy for Governor of American Samoa at a campaign rally at the same Tradewinds Hotel on May 17. The rally consisted of about seven hundred Lutu supporters. Lutu promised to tackle a number of issues if elected governor, including corruption, rising food and energy prices and the economy.

Utu Abe Malae and his running mate, Nua Mailo Saoluaga, formally announced their candidacy on June 10 at a gathering at the Maliu Mai Beach Resort in Pago Pago.

This is not the first time that Tulafono and Lutu faced each other in a gubernatorial election. Tulafono defeated Lutu in the 2004 gubernatorial runoff election with 56 percent of the total vote to Lutu's 44 percent. Lutu also fell short in his bids for Lieutenant Governor of American Samoa in the 1996 and 2000 elections, losing both times to Tulafono.

The President of the American Samoa Senate, Lolo Moliga, also originally announced his intention to run for governor as well. However, Lolo withdrew from the race on June 13, just two months into his campaign, citing existing commitments to his extended family clan. He also noted the need to prevent divisiveness within the families of the Manu'a islands, where many of the gubernatorial and Lt. governor candidates have ancestral ties.

Four of the 2008 candidates for governor or lieutenant governor in the 2008 election either were from or had ancestral ties to the Manu'a Islands. Those with Manu'a ancestry are incumbent Lt. Governor Ipulasi Aitofele Sunia, lieutenant governor candidate Velega Savali, and both members of the gubernatorial team of Utu Abe Malae and his running mate, Nua Mailo Saoluaga.

The deadline to register as a candidate for governor in the current election was September 1 at 16:30. An official list of the four teams was released by the election office the following day.

=== Candidates ===
- Togiola Tulafono – Incumbent Governor of American Samoa, affiliated with the Democratic Party
  - Running mate: Ipulasi Aitofele Sunia, Incumbent Lieutenant Governor of American Samoa
- Afoa Moega Lutu – Former Attorney General of American Samoa, candidate for governor in 2004, affiliated with the Republican Party
  - Running mate: Velega Savali, former American Samoan Treasurer (2005–2008)
- Utu Abe Malae – Former President of the Development Bank of American Samoa, affiliated with the Republican Party
  - Running mate: Nua Mailo Saoluaga, former Speaker of the American Samoa House of Representatives (1997–2002)
- Tuika Tuika – Accountant, affiliated with the Republican Party
  - Running mate: Tee Masaniai, United States military retiree

All elections in American Samoa are officially non-partisan, but Tulafono and Sunia identify with the Democratic Party.

=== House of Representatives ===
There were 54 candidates vying for the 20 elected seats in the American Samoa House of Representatives. All seats in the House are up for election in 2008. Every incumbent member of the House sought re-election, except for Gaoteote P. Gaoteote who is retiring. The only member who ran unopposed was Rep. Agaoleatu Charlie Tautolo.

=== U.S. House of Representatives ===
Ten term incumbent Delegate Eni Faleomavaega, a Democrat, sought an 11th term. He was challenged by Republican Aumua Amata Coleman and Independent Rosie F. Tago Lancaster.

=== Referendum ===
A referendum to allow the legislative override of the governor's vetoes was also on the ballot.

The American Samoa Fono passed the proposal giving itself the authority to override a veto by the Governor of American Samoa. The proposal was then submitted to the Governor's office to be forwarded to the American Samoa election office as a referendum. The referendum will ask voters to agree to amend the Constitution of American Samoa to give the Fono, rather than the United States Secretary of the Interior, the power to override a veto by the Governor.

Currently, a veto can only be overridden by the United States Secretary of the Interior, who is based in Washington D.C. Any veto powers bestowed on the Fono would require a two-thirds majority in both the American Samoa House of Representatives and the American Samoa Senate before becoming law.

== Results ==
=== Governor ===
Candidate	Running mate	First round		Second round	
Candidate	Running mate	Votes	%	Votes	%
Togiola Tulafono	Ipulasi Aitofele Sunia	5,117	41.24	6,590	56.45
Utu Abe Malae	Nua Mailo Saoluaga	3,881	31.28	5,084	43.55
Afoa Moega Lutu	Velega Savali	3,347	26.97		
Tuika Tuika	Tee Masaniai	63	0.51		
Total		12,408	100.00	11,674	100.00

=== House of Representatives ===
District	Candidate	Votes	%
1 – Manuʻa	Fetu Fetui, Jr.	360	27.01
1 – Manuʻa	Fa'afetai I'aulualo	340	25.51
1 – Manuʻa	Aloali'i Maui	294	22.06
1 – Manuʻa	Mapu Puaopea F. Paopao	260	19.50
1 – Manuʻa	Meleagi Suitonu-Chapman	79	5.93
2 – Manuʻa	Laolagi F. Savali Vaeao	193	44.88
2 – Manuʻa	Ali'ilelei Fili Laolagi	181	42.09
2 – Manuʻa	Togia'i Fa'amoemoe Soli	56	13.02
3 – Vaifanua	Simei Pulu	365	57.30
3 – Vaifanua	Lauti Simona	218	34.22
3 – Vaifanua	Tiapula Imo Mauga	54	8.48
4 – Saole	Agaoleatu Charlie Tautolo	424	100
5 – Sua #1	Puleleiite Li'amatua Tufele, Jr.	223	39.75
5 – Sua #1	Otomalesau John Ah Sue	161	28.70
5 – Sua #1	Tuialofi Fa'alae Lauatua'a Tunupopo	135	24.06
5 – Sua #1	Epa Poyer-Moliva'a	42	7.49
6 – Sua #2	Lemapu Suiaunoa Talo	128	34.69
6 – Sua #2	Folau Fatu I'aulualo	121	32.79
6 – Sua #2	Limutau F. C. Limutau	120	32.52
7 – Maoputasi #1	Vailoata Eteuati Amituanai	228	45.60
7 – Maoputasi #1	Tali T. Maae	157	31.40
7 – Maoputasi #1	Sua Carl Schuster	115	23.00
8 – Maoputasi #2	Sipa Anoa'i	247	47.41
8 – Maoputasi #2	Steve Leasiolagi	236	45.30
8 – Maoputasi #2	Maugaoali'i James Mailo	38	7.29
9 – Maoputasi #3	Va'amua Henry Sesepasara	512	58.85
9 – Maoputasi #3	Fiasili Puni E. Haleck	358	41.15
10 – Maoputasi #4	Vaito'a Hans A. Langkilde	175	55.91
10 – Maoputasi #4	Tu'umolimoli Saena Moliga	138	44.09
11 – Maoputasi #5	Paopaoailua J. M. Fiaui	271	53.88
11 – Maoputasi #5	Vasai Fred A. Vasai	232	46.12
12 – Ituau	Archie Taotasi Soliai	776	28.35
12 – Ituau	Fagasoaia Foa A. Lealaitafea	618	22.58
12 – Ituau	Mary Lauagaia M. Taufete'e	597	21.81
12 – Ituau	Valasi Lavata'i Gaisoa	525	19.18
12 – Ituau	Talalua Siliva Patu	221	8.07
13 – Fofo	Vaiausia Eliko Yandall	454	46.95
13 – Fofo	Puletu Dick Koko	413	42.71
13 – Fofo	"Nana" Christina Samana	100	10.34
14 – Lealataua	Savali Talavou Ale	269	54.02
14 – Lealataua	Ethan Lake	229	45.98
15 – Tualauta	Larry Sanitoa	1,217	30.50
15 – Tualauta	Galu Satele, Jr.	1,178	29.52
15 – Tualauta	Tagaloa Toloa Letuli	657	16.47
15 – Tualauta	Mase A. Akapo	599	15.01
15 – Tualauta	Lucia Alefosio Bartley	238	5.96
15 – Tualauta	Sinalaulii T. Mamea Leota	101	2.53
16 – Tualatai	Galumalemana Bill Satele	277	40.38
16 – Tualatai	Manu Talamoa	265	38.63
16 – Tualatai	Lina Lafaele Prendergast	64	9.33
16 – Tualatai	Ken Tupua	44	6.41
16 – Tualatai	Solia L. Faauaa Tosi	36	5.25
17 – Leasina	Atualevao Gafatasi Afalava	291	59.15
17 – Leasina	Tuilesu Vaina	201	40.85

=== Delegate ===
Candidate	Party	Votes	%
Eni Faleomavaega	Democratic Party	7,499	60.38
Amata Coleman Radewagen	Republican Party	4,350	35.03
Rosie Tago Lancaster	Independent	570	4.59
Total		12,419	100.00

=== Referendum ===
The legislative over-ride proposal was defeated narrowly in the referendum, thereby maintaining the veto powers to the United States Secretary of the Interior.

Choice	Votes	%
For	6,137	49.91
Against	6,159	50.09
Total	12,296	100.00
Source: Election Office
