= Togiola Tulafono =

American Samoan politician

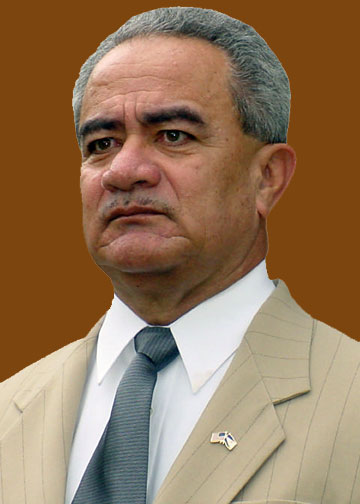

6th Governor of American Samoa
- In office March 26, 2003 – January 3, 2013; Acting: March 26, 2003 – April 7, 2003
- Lieutenant: Faoa Aitofele Sunia
- Preceded by: Tauese Sunia
- Succeeded by: Lolo Matalasi Moliga

7th Lieutenant Governor of American Samoa
- In office January 3, 1997 – March 26, 2003
- Governor: Tauese Sunia
- Preceded by: Tauese Sunia
- Succeeded by: Faoa Aitofele Sunia

Personal details
- Born: February 28, 1947 (age 79) Aunu'u, American Samoa, U.S.
- Party: Democratic
- Spouse: Mary Ann Tu
- Children: 5 daughters 1 son
- Education: Chadron State College (BA); Washburn University (JD)

Togiola Talalelei A. Tulafono (born February 28, 1947) is an American Samoan politician and lawyer who served as the sixth governor of American Samoa. He is a member of the Democratic Party. He had previously served as the seventh lieutenant governor.

Tulafono was lieutenant governor when, on March 26, 2003, Governor Tauese Pita Fiti Sunia died. He then became acting governor and officially became governor on April 7, 2003. He was elected to a full 4-year term in the November 2004 gubernatorial elections and was re-elected in the November 2008 gubernatorial election.

Tulafono did not run for governor in 2012 as he was term-limited and could not seek a third consecutive term. He was an unsuccessful candidate for American Samoa's at-large congressional district in 2014.

== Biography ==
=== Early life ===
Togiola T. A. Tulafono was born on February 28, 1947, in Aunu'u Island, American Samoa.

Tulafono was educated in Samoa, attending elementary school in Autu'u and Samoana High School. He attended Chadron State College in the United States, where he earned bachelor's degrees in both political science and sociology in 1970. He received a doctor of laws degree from the Washburn University School of Law in Topeka, Kansas, in 1975.

Tulafono has served as a deacon of the Congregational Christian Church in Sa'ilele, American Samoa, for over 25 years.

=== Career ===
After college, Tulafono worked as a legal assistant at American Samoa's Attorney General's Office and as an administrative assistant for the Secretary of Samoan Affairs. He spent two years each working as a private practice attorney and as a vice president for South Pacific Island Airways during the late 1970s.

Tulafono was appointed as a district court judge in 1978 and then to the American Samoa Senate in 1980. After serving one term in the upper house for Sa'Ole County, he reentered law practice, but then ran again successfully for a Senate seat in 1989. However, he was later elected to the American Samoa Senate for Sua County for eight years. He also chaired the board of directors for the American Samoa Power Authority and was the first chairman of the Board of Higher Education.

Tulafono further co-chaired the South Pacific Mini Games committee in 1997 when American Samoa hosted the games. He later co-chaired the American Samoa Centennial Committee in 2000, which was formed to commemorate the 100th anniversary of American Samoa becoming a territorial possession of the United States.

Tulafono presently serves as vice chairman of the territorial church general assembly of American Samoa as of 2008.

After his term as governor ended, Tulafono ran for U.S. Delegate for American Samoa's at-large congressional district for the 2014 elections, but he lost at third place with 11% of the vote.

== Governor of American Samoa ==
Tulafono was sworn in as the Lieutenant Governor of American Samoa under Governor Tauese Sunia on January 3, 1997. Sunia and Tulafono were re-elected in 2000 and sworn into their second terms in office on January 3, 2001.

Tulafono remained lieutenant governor until Sunia's sudden death from a heart attack on March 26, 2003. Tulafono became acting governor until he was formally sworn into office as Governor of American Samoa on April 7, 2003.

In the first round of elections on November 2, 2004, Tulafono received 48.4% of the vote. In the second round on November 16, Tulafono defeated Afoa Moega Lutu, who had run against him for the position of lieutenant governor in 2000, by a vote of 56%-44%. As governor, Tulafano is a member of the National Governors Association and the Democratic Governors Association.

Tulafono took part in endorsing Senator Hillary Clinton for President of the United States during the 2008 presidential primaries and the American Samoa Democratic caucuses, 2008 and became the national co-chair of Asian Americans and Pacific Islanders for Hillary.

It was under Tulafono's leadership that American Samoa became, in November 2011, a founding member of the Polynesian Leaders Group, a regional grouping intended to cooperate on a variety of issues including culture and language, education, responses to climate change, and trade and investment.

=== The dispute with Hawaiian Airlines ===
In July 2006, Governor Tulafono issued a mandate to Hawaiian Airlines, giving the airline ninety days to cease service to Pago Pago International Airport in Pago Pago. The carrier, which offers the only service to American Samoa (beside commuter flights to Apia, in the country of Samoa), from its hub in Honolulu, was accused of predatory pricing practices and ethnic harassment by the governor.

In August 2006, the FAA stated in an official letter to the governor that the territory must continue to allow Hawaiian Airlines to fly the Honolulu-Pago Pago route or risk losing U.S. financial assistance.

=== 2008 gubernatorial election ===
Governor Togiola Tulafono and Lieutenant Governor Ipulasi Aitofele Sunia announced their joint reelection campaign on May 10, 2008, at the Tradewinds Hotel in Tafuna. The 2008 American Samoa gubernatorial election took place on November 4, 2008. Governor Tulafono and Lieutenant Governor Sunia received 41.1% of the vote, challengers Utu Abe Malae and Nua Mailo Saoluaga received 31.4%, and Afoa Leulumoega Lutu and Velega Savali received 26.8 percent. Because no candidate exceeded 50% of the vote, a runoff election was held between the top two candidates, Tulafono and Utu Abe Malae on November 18, 2008, which Tulafono won.

=== Independence discussion ===
In 2012, both the Governor and American Samoa's delegate to the US Congress called for the populace to consider a move towards autonomy if not independence, to a mixed response.

Political offices
Preceded by Tauese Sunia	Lieutenant Governor of American Samoa; 1997–2003	Succeeded by Faoa Aitofele Sunia
Preceded by Tauese Sunia	Governor of American Samoa; 2003–2013	Succeeded by Lolo Matalasi Moliga
Party political offices
Preceded by Tauese Sunia	Democratic nominee for Governor of American Samoa; 2004, 2008	Succeeded by Faoa Aitofele Sunia
