= Lieutenant Governor of American Samoa =

Secondary executive in the government of American Samoa

- Territory seal

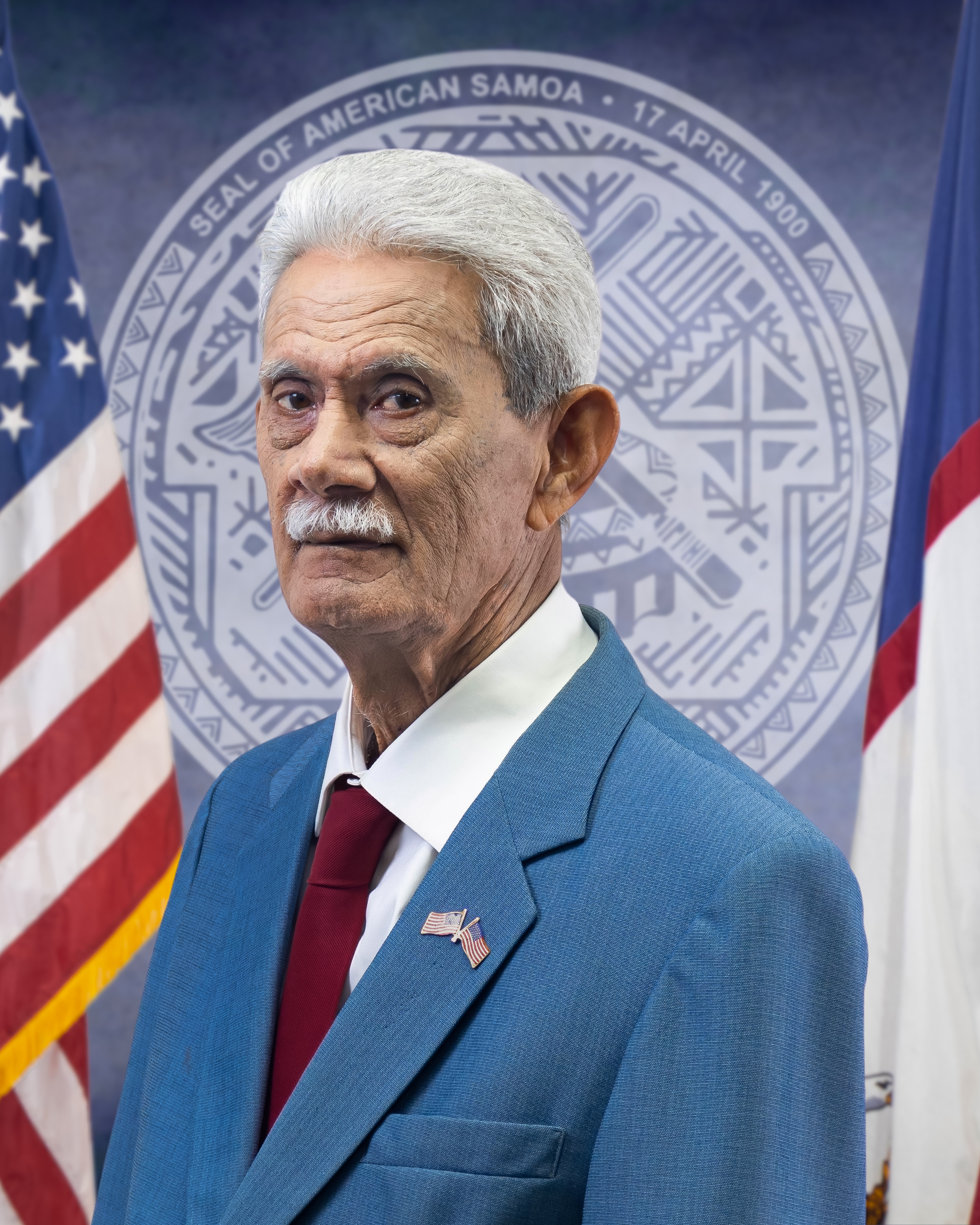
- Incumbent; Pulu Ae Ae since January 3, 2025
- Type: Lieutenant Governor
- Formation: 1974
- First holder: Frank Barnett

The government of American Samoa consists of a locally elected governor, lieutenant governor and the American Samoa Fono, which consists of an 18-member Senate and a 21-member House of Representatives. The first popular election for Governor and Lieutenant Governor took place in 1977. Candidates for the offices run together on a joint ticket. The first woman to run for election was Arieta Enesi Mulitauaopele in 1977.

The current lieutenant governor is Pula Ae Ae, who has been in office since 2025.

== List of lieutenant governors of American Samoa ==
=== Appointed lieutenant governors ===
- Frank Barnett (Democrat, 1974–76)

=== Elected lieutenant governors ===
Image	Name	Political party	Term started	Term ended	Notes
	Tufele Liamatua (1940–2011)	Republican	January 3, 1978	January 3, 1985	First elected lt. governor of American Samoa
	Eni Faleomavaega (1943–2017)	Democratic	January 3, 1985	January 2, 1989	
	Galea'i Peni Poumele (1926–1992)	Republican	January 2, 1989	July 27, 1992	Poumele died in office in July 1992.
	Gaioi Tufele Galeai	Republican	August 1992	January 4, 1993	Widow of Lt. Governor Galea'i Peni Poumele. Served the remainder of Poumele's unexpired term
	Tauese Sunia (1941–2003)	Democratic	January 4, 1993	January 3, 1997	
	Togiola Tulafono (b. 1947)	Democratic	January 3, 1997	March 26, 2003	Acting governor from March 26, 2003, to April 7, 2003, following the death of Governor Tauese Sunia.
Office vacant March 23 – April 11, 2003
	Faoa Aitofele Sunia (b. 1943)	Democratic	April 11, 2003	January 3, 2013	
	Lemanu Peleti Mauga (b. 1960)	Independent	January 3, 2013	January 3, 2021	
	Lemanu Peleti Mauga (b. 1960)	Democratic	January 3, 2013	January 3, 2021	
	Salo Ale (b. 1969)	Democratic	January 3, 2021	January 3, 2025	
	Salo Ale (b. 1969)	Democratic	January 3, 2021	January 3, 2025	
	Pulu Ae Ae (b. 1945)	Republican	January 3, 2025	Incumbent	
