= 1977 American Samoan gubernatorial election =

- 8 November 1977
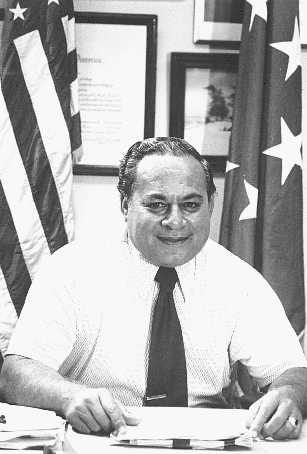

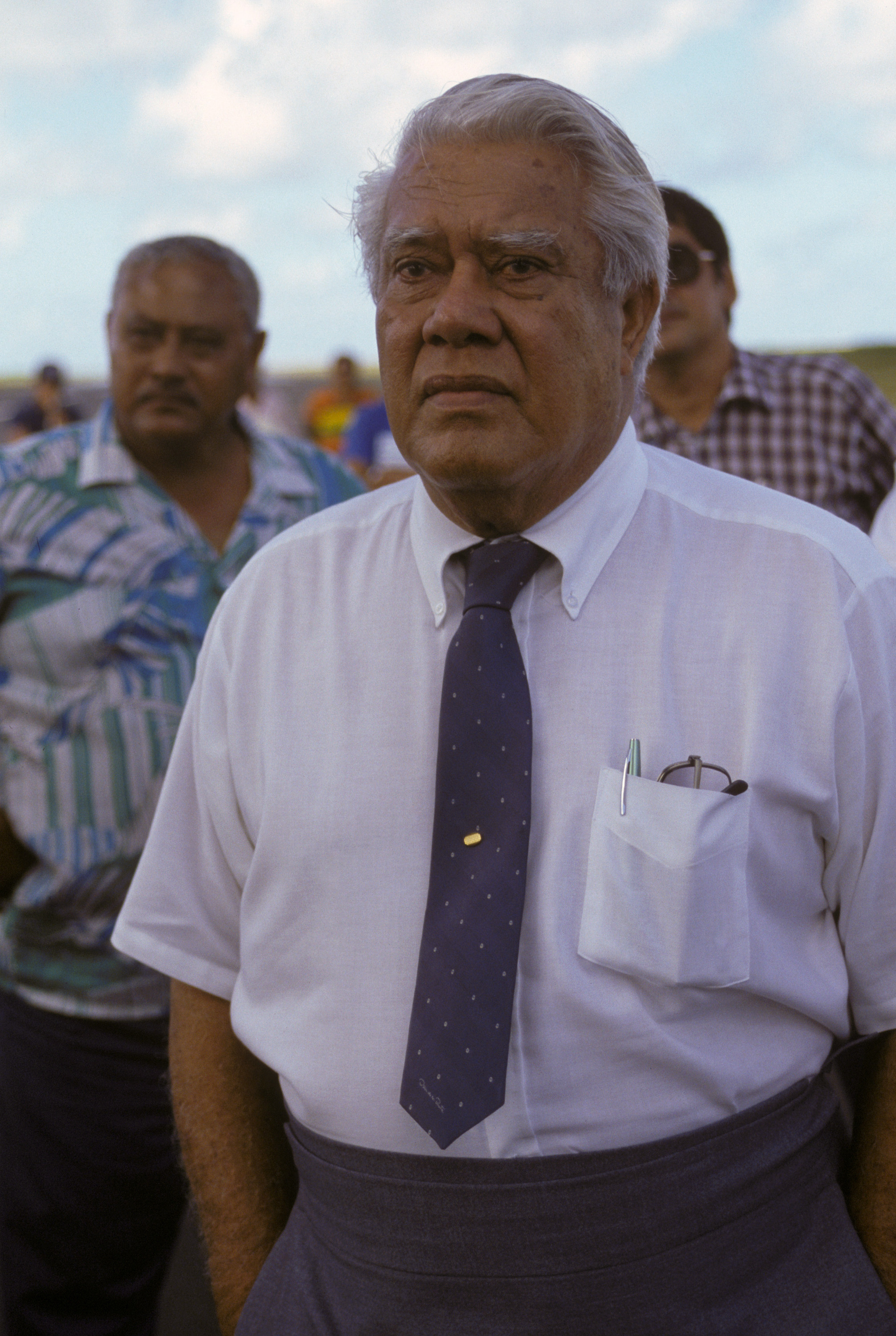
Candidate	Peter Tali Coleman	A. P. Lutali
Party	Republican	Democratic
Popular vote	3,326	2,627
Percentage	55.87%	44.13%
Elected Governor
Peter Tali Coleman
Republican

Gubernatorial elections were held in American Samoa on 8 November 1977, with a run-off between the top two candidates on 22 November. Peter Tali Coleman was elected with 56% of the vote in the second round.

This election was the first gubernatorial election ever to be held in American Sāmoa. It featured multiple two-person tickets for governor and lieutenant governor. The leading slates were Peter Coleman–Tufele Liʻamatua; A. P. Lutali–Fofo I. F. Sunia; and A. U. Fuimaono–Lutu Tenari. Because victory required an absolute majority, Coleman’s first-round plurality (40.2%) triggered a runoff, which he won. He assumed office on January 3, 1978, as the territory’s first elected governor.

== Candidates ==
Former appointed governor Peter Tali Coleman ran with Tufele Liamatua as his running mate for lieutenant governor. The territory's delegate at-large A. P. Lutali ran with Fofō Iosefa Fiti Sunia, a Senator. Former delegate at-large A. U. Fuimaono ran alongside Senator Lutu T. S. Fuimaono.

== Results ==
Candidate	First round		Second round	
Candidate	Votes	%	Votes	%
Peter Tali Coleman	2,358	40.26	3,326	55.87
A. P. Lutali	1,270	21.68	2,627	44.13
A. U. Fuimaono	955	16.31		
Galeai Poumele	833	14.22		
Leiato Tuli	387	6.61		
Luis Lagarejos	54	0.92		
Total	5,857	100.00	5,953	100.00
Source: Pacific Islands Monthly
