= Republican Party of American Samoa =

American Samoa affiliate of the Republican Party

Republican Party of American Samoa Vaega Faaupufai Fa'asao o Amerika Sāmoa
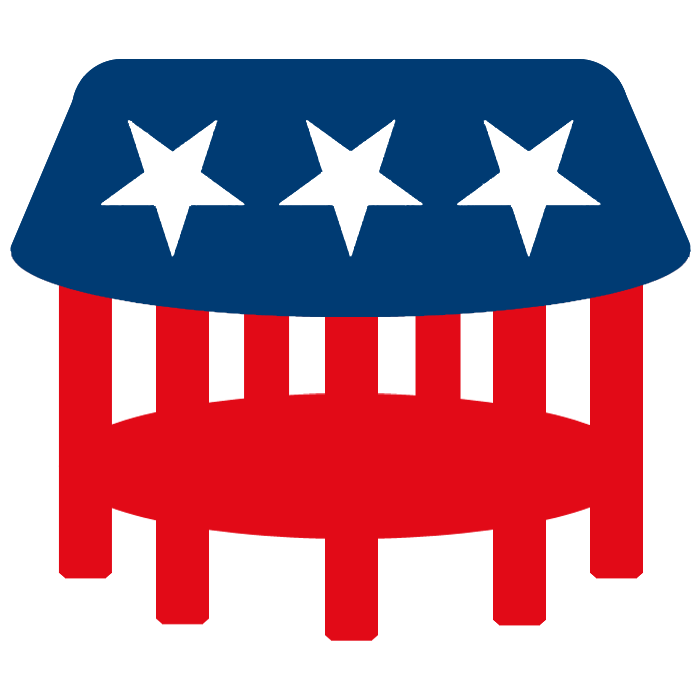
- Chairman: Utu Abe Malae
- Vice Chairman: John Raynar
- National Committeewoman: Amata Coleman Radewagen
- National Committeeman: Su'a Carl Schuster
- Treasurer: Tina Ione
- Founded: 1985
- Headquarters: P.O. Box 3564, Pago Pago, AS 96799
- Ideology: Conservatism
- National affiliation: Republican Party
- Colors: Red
- U.S. House of Representatives: 1 / 1
- Seats in the American Samoa Senate: 0 / 18
- Seats in the American Samoa House of Representatives: 4 / 21

Election symbol

Republican Party of American Samoa (Samoan: Vaega Faaupufai Fa'asao o Amerika Sāmoa) is the affiliate of the U.S. Republican Party in American Samoa. It is based in the territorial capital of Pago Pago.

The party was founded by Peter Tali Coleman. Coleman was in 1956 the first Samoan to be appointed Governor. He became the first popularly elected Governor in 1977 and won re-election in 1980 and 1988.

Coleman's daughter, Aumua Amata Radewagen, is a current Congresswoman and also the party's National Committee Woman. She received the unanimous endorsement from the party in 2018 in order to run for Congress. She is the first woman to represent American Samoa in the U.S. House of Representatives. She is also the first Republican representative in Congress from American Samoa. In 2018, she won reelection with 83.3 percent of the vote, the highest number of votes in American Samoa history. She has represented the party in the Republican National Committee (RNC) since 1986.

In 2008, all delegates were won by John McCain. In the 2012 Republican primary, Mitt Romney won all nine delegates from American Samoa. In the 2016 American Samoa Republican caucuses, Donald Trump won all nine delegates.

== Current leadership ==
In March 2016, the party elected new leadership in the lead up to the 2016 American Samoa Republican Caucus.

Party Leader	Position
Utu Abe Malae	Chairman
John Raynar	Vice-chairman
Aumua Amata Coleman Radewagen	National Committeewoman
Su'a Carl Schuster	National Committeeman
Sailitafa Samoa	Secretary
Tina Ione	Treasurer

== History ==
The Republican Party of American Samoa was officially organized in 1985.

In the 2014 elections, Radewagen was elected as American Samoa's Delegate to Congress. After having served fourteen consecutive terms in Washington, DC, Democrat Eni Faleomavaega lost his reelection bid to Republican Aumua Amata during the 2014 American Samoan general election. She won reelection in 2016 with 75.4%, and won reelection with 83.3% of the votes in a three-way race in 2018.

In 2015, the Republican Party of American Samoa party criticized the Democratic National Committee for asking its then vice-chair Tulsi Gabbard, who was born in American Samoa, not to attend a presidential primary debate in Nevada. The Republican Party of American Samoa also planned to invite Gabbard to their next Republican primary debate.

In the 2024 elections, Pula Nikolao Pula was elected as the Governor of American Samoa. After having served a single term as governor, incumbent Democrat Lemanu Peleti Mauga lost his reelection bid to challenger Pula Nikolao Pula during the 2024 American Samoan general election. Because no candidate captured a majority in the initial three-way race on November 5, 2024, the contest advanced to a runoff two weeks later. Pula won the runoff election on November 19, 2024, with 59.8% of the total votes to decisively unseat the incumbent administration by nearly 20 percentage points, thus giving Republicans a trifecta in the territory.

== Notable people ==
- Afoa Moega Lutu, former Attorney General of American Samoa; current member of the American Samoa Senate
- Pula Nikolao Pula, current Governor of American Samoa, faipule (member) of the American Samoa House of Representatives, former mayor of Pago Pago
- Pulu Ae Ae Jr., current Lieutenant Governor of American Samoa
- Amata Coleman Radewagen, current Congresswoman; National Committeewoman for the Republican Party of American Samoa
- Fainu'ulelei S. Utu, former senator and Speaker of the House of Representatives
- Galea'i Peni Poumele, former senator; member of the House of Representatives; Lieutenant Governor of American Samoa
- John Raynar, current chairman for Donald Trump for President, American Samoa chapter; Vice Chairman for the Republican Party of American Samoa; at-large delegate to the 2016 Republican National Convention
- Peter Tali Coleman, first person of Samoan descent to be appointed Governor and later American Samoa's first popularly elected Governor
- Savali Talavou Ale, former Speaker of the House and longest-serving member of the American Samoa House of Representatives
- Su'a Schuster, former party chairman; current national committeeman for the Republican Party of American Samoa; at-large delegate to the 2008, 2012, and 2016 Republican National Conventions.
- Te'o J. Fuavai, former chairman; senator; Speaker of the House and member of the American Samoa House of Representatives
- Utu Abe Malae, former Chairperson of the American Samoa Republican Party and member of the American Samoa Senate

== See also ==
- List of political parties in American Samoa
- American Samoa Republicans
