= Cyclone Ofa =

South Pacific cyclone in 1990

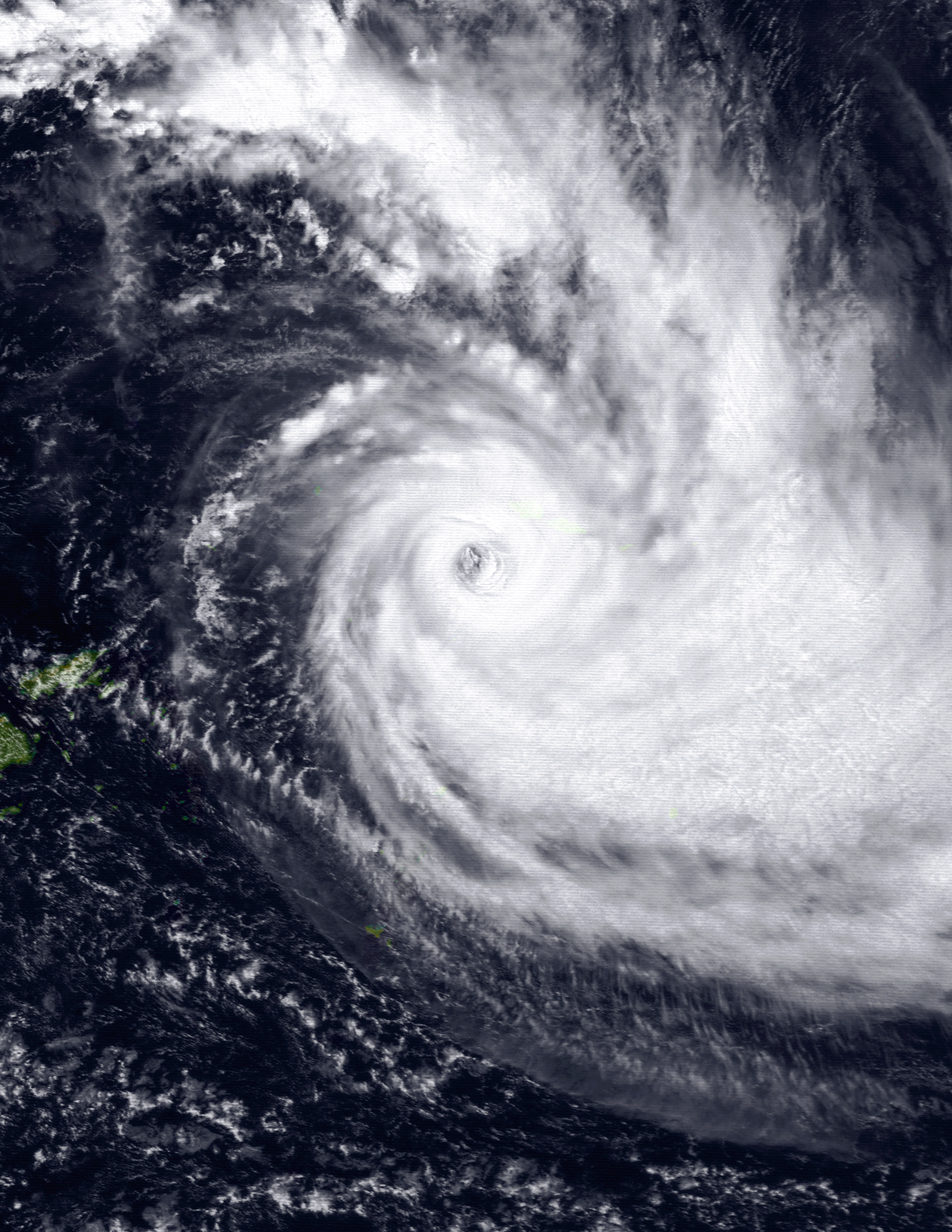
- Cyclone Ofa southwest of Samoa on 4 February

Meteorological history
- Formed: 27 January 1990
- Extratropical: 8 February 1990
- Dissipated: 10 February 1990

Category 4 severe tropical cyclone
- 10-minute sustained (MetService)
- Highest winds: 185 km/h (115 mph)
- Lowest pressure: 925 hPa (mbar); 27.32 inHg

Category 4-equivalent tropical cyclone
- 1-minute sustained (SSHWS/JTWC)
- Highest winds: 215 km/h (130 mph)
- Lowest pressure: 927 hPa (mbar); 27.37 inHg

Overall effects
- Fatalities: 8 total
- Damage: $188 million (1990 USD)
- Areas affected: Tuvalu; Wallis and Futuna; Tokelau; Samoan Islands; Tonga; Niue
- IBTrACS
- Part of the 1989–90 South Pacific cyclone season

Severe Tropical Cyclone Ofa was a powerful tropical cyclone that caused severe damage in Polynesia in February 1990. The system was first noted on 27 January 1990, near Tuvalu, as a shallow tropical depression that had developed within the South Pacific Convergence Zone. The cloud pattern slowly organized, and on 31 January, while located east of Tuvalu, Ofa attained cyclone intensity. Moving slowly southeast, Ofa developed storm-force winds. It attained hurricane-force winds on 2 February. Cyclone Ofa reached peak intensity on 4 February. Shortly after, its peak Ofa began to weaken over a less favourable environment. Ofa was declared an extratropical cyclone on 8 February, though the system was still tracked by meteorologists until 10 February.

Ofa produced gales or high winds or gales on many islands, resulting in widespread damage due to a combination of storm surge and high seas. In all, eight people were killed and damage totaled to US$187 million. The worst effects were recorded in Samoa, where seven people were killed. Roughly 200 people were evacuated, and 10 to 20 others were injured through the islands. Extreme damage to crops and trees was also recorded. Elsewhere, Ofa was blamed for the lowest ever recorded pressure on the island of Niue, along with considerable damage.

== Meteorological history ==
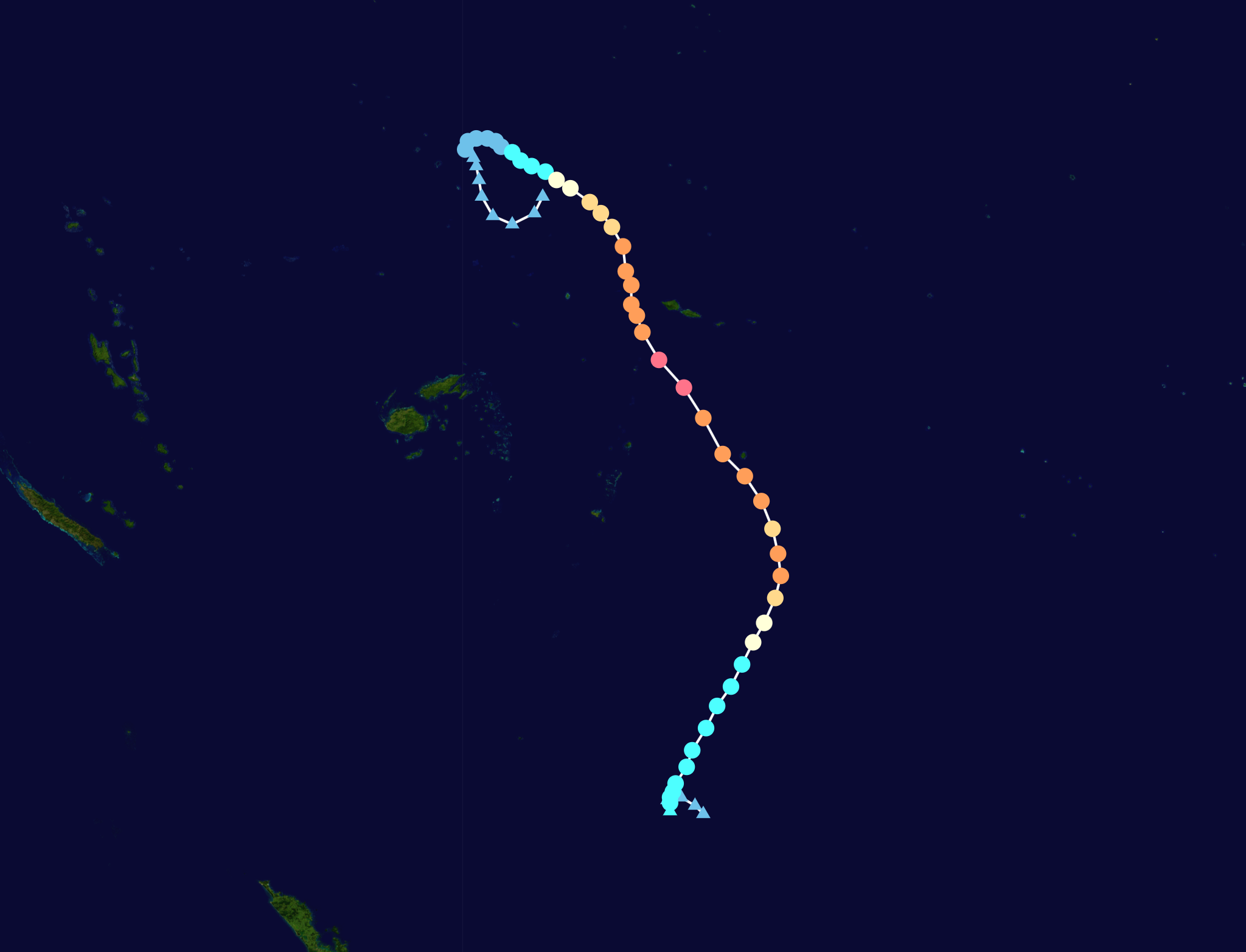
Map plotting the storm's track and intensity, according to the Saffir–Simpson scale Map key Saffir–Simpson scale Tropical depression (≤38 mph, ≤62 km/h) Tropical storm (39–73 mph, 63–118 km/h) Category 1 (74–95 mph, 119–153 km/h) Category 2 (96–110 mph, 154–177 km/h) Category 3 (111–129 mph, 178–208 km/h) Category 4 (130–156 mph, 209–251 km/h) Category 5 (≥157 mph, ≥252 km/h) Unknown Storm type Tropical cyclone Subtropical cyclone Extratropical cyclone, remnant low, tropical disturbance, or monsoon depression

Towards the end of January 1990, a surge in the Northern Hemisphere's trade winds and the Southern Hemispheres monsoon, led to the South Pacific Convergence Zone (SPCZ) and the Australian monsoon trough becoming active after a prolonged period of dormancy. As a result, two shallow tropical depressions were spawned; one over the Coral Sea that went on to become Cyclone Nancy, while the other was first noted within the SPCZ over Tuvalu on 27 January. Over the next two days the system developed little and remained slow moving, near the Tuvaluan atoll of Funafuti. During January 30, the depression moved towards the north-east and started to organize, as pressures near the systems center rapidly falling. During the next day the system subsequently started to curve south-eastwards and away from Tuvalu, before the United States Naval Western Oceanography Center (NWOC) initiated advisories on the system and designated it as Tropical Cyclone 13P on 31 January. At 19:17 UTC on January 31, Fiji Meteorological Service named the system Ofa, after it had developed into a category 1 tropical cyclone on the Australian tropical cyclone intensity scale.

As it was named the system was located about 300 km (185 mi) to the east of Tuvalu and had started to curve more towards the south-southeast. On 1 February, as Ofa started to affect Western Samoa, the NWOC reported that Ofa has become a Category 1-equivalent hurricane on the Saffir-Simpson Hurricane Wind Scale (SSHWS).

The FMS subsequently reported during the next day that the system had become a category 3 severe tropical cyclone. Ofa passed about 110 km (70 mi) to the west of the Western Samoan Island of Savai'i between 10:00 and 18:00 UTC during 3 February. Early the next day as the system started to accelerate towards the south-southeast towards the island nation of Niue, the NWOC estimated that Ofa had peaked with 1-minute sustained wind speeds of 215 km/h (130 mph), which made it equivalent to a category 4 hurricane on the SSHWS. Later that day the FMS estimated that the system had peaked as a category 4 severe tropical cyclone, with 10-minute sustained wind speeds of 185 km/h (115 mph). During the early hours of 5 February, Ofa started to show signs that it had started to weaken, as it passed about 55 km (35 mi) to the west of Niue. Over the next day, the system slowly weakened as it moved southwards, before the FMS passed the primary warning responsibility for Ofa to the New Zealand Meteorological Service late on 6 February, as the system had already moved below 25°S. The system subsequently weakened very quickly and started to transition into an extratropical cyclone, as it encountered strong upper level winds and cooler waters. The system completed this transition during 8 February, before the remnants were last noted on 10 February after performing a small clockwise loop.

== Effects ==
Area	Damages (USD)	Ref
American Samoa	$50 million	
Niue	$2.5 million	
Tokelau	$2.4 million	
Tonga	$3.2 million	
Tuvalu	Unknown	
Wallis and Futuna	Minor	
Western Samoa	$130 million	
Total	$188 million	

Cyclone Ofa was considered to be the worst tropical cyclone to affect Polynesia since Severe Tropical Cyclone Bebe in 1972. The system affected seven different island nations and caused gales or much stronger winds in six of those countries, which resulted in damage ranging from moderate to very severe. Storm tide from the cyclone which is the combined effect of storm surge and high tide caused havoc in several countries and was the major cause of destruction. Overall the system killed at least eight people while it was estimated that the overall damage would amount to over US$180 million with damage totals of at least US$150 million and US$30 million in Western and American Samoa.

=== Tuvalu ===
The island nation of Tuvalu was affected by Severe Tropical Cyclone Ofa during 1 February, with strong to gale-force winds causing a major impact on the island nation, along with the Samoa depression that affected the islands a few days later. The majority of the islands reported damage to vegetation and crops, such as bananas, coconuts and breadfruits. Staff housing and a chapel on a government secondary school campus were up-roofed and collapsed, while a supermarket building collapsed as a result of heavy swells. On Vaitupu Island around 85% of residential homes, trees and food crops were destroyed, while residential homes were also destroyed on the islands of Niutao, Nui and Nukulaelae. On Funafuti sea waves flattened the Hurricane Bebe bank at the southern end of the airstrip, which caused sea flooding and prompted the evacuation of several families from their homes. In Nui and Niulakita there was a minor loss of the landscape because of sea flooding while there were no lives lost. After the systems had impacted Tuvalu, a Disaster Rehabilitation Sub-Committee was appointed to evaluate the damage caused and make recommendations to the National Disaster Committee and to the Cabinet on what should be done to help rehabilitate the affected areas. Emergency food aid and other humanitarian relief assistance was received from donors and the Red Cross. The total cost of reconstruction in the island nation was estimated to have exceeded $US1 million.

=== Wallis and Futuna ===
During January 31, after Ofa's precursor depression had remained near the edge of its area of responsibility for a few days, the Wallis and Futuna Meteorological Service decided to inform local authorities about the system and their expectations for it to develop further. During the next day, after the system had been named Ofa, the FMS issued a tropical cyclone alert, before a yellow alert was triggered as the system was expected to intensify further and impact both islands. On 2 February, the FMS issued a gale warning for Wallis while maintaining the alert for Futuna, as it was expected to pass near enough to Wallis to cause gale-force winds on the island. After the system continued to move southwards and had become a severe tropical cyclone it triggered the declaration of a red alert as well as the Organization of the Civil Security Response plan for the whole of the territory. It was subsequently decided to put the satellite telecommunication antenna into its survival position, which as a result meant that Wallis and Futuna were cut off from the international telecommunication network. The system subsequently passed about 240 km (150 mi) to the east of the island and produced gale-force winds on the island for a brief period during that day. Despite numerous objections residents were evacuated from the east coast of Wallis, as high seas, heavy swell and a storm surge of about 1 metre (3.3 ft) above the astronomical tide caused flooding on the east coast of Wallis. Minor damages to trees, houses, plantations of yams and taros, government buildings and village roads was reported, while no there were no deaths or casualties reported on Wallis.

=== Tokelau ===
A gale warning was issued by the FMS for the whole of Tokelau on 2 February, as Ofa started to affect the island with heavy rain, high seas and strong to gale-force winds. Ofa caused extensive damage to the islands public buildings, after sea walls around the atolls of Nukunonu, Atafu and Fakaofo were washed away by high seas. Around 80% of the breadfruit and coconut trees were destroyed or damaged by the winds, while an inundation of water associated with Ofa was responsible for washing away or contaminating topsoil. The whole population of Swains Island was made homeless, after their homes suffered extensive damage. The island also suffered from a complete loss of agricultural crops including bananas, pawpaws, breadfruits and taro. No deaths or serious injuries were reported within the island nation. About a week after the system had affected Tokelau, the Royal New Zealand Air Force delivered urgently needed supplies via airdrop, before further assistance from New Zealand arrived by sea.

=== Western Samoa ===
Cyclone Ofa affected Western Samoa between 1–4 February with heavy rain, huge waves, sea spray, storm surge and wind gusts exceeding 150 km/h (95 mph). (Note: Until 1998 Samoa was known as Western Samoa.) This created an impact on the island nation that had not been encountered in over 100 years, while the entire population was left in a state of shock. Ahead of Ofa affecting Western Samoa, the FMS issued various gale and storm force wind warnings for Samoa, however, due to communication and various other problems some of these warnings did not reach the Apia Observatory. Some of the warnings that did get through were distorted and contained strong wind warnings, rather than storm force wind warnings. As a result, it was not known what was broadcast to the public who were warned to expect strong winds rather than storm force winds and thus the FMS was left with no doubt, that the correct precautionary measures were not taken.

On 2 February, (1 February, Samoa Standard Time (SST)) the meteorological stations at the Apia Observatory and the Faleolo Airport started to report gale-force winds. (Note: This article defines Samoa Standard Time as being 11 hours behind Coordinated Universal Time (UTC) per the local time used in Western Samoa between 1892 and December 29, 2009.) During that day rain became heavy and widespread, before as the winds picked up most communications with the island nation were lost. At the height of the storm the only means of communication with Western Samoa, was through a Polynesian Airlines Boeing 727 aircraft that was standing at Faleolo Airport. The Apia meteorological office was hit by high sea waves at 21:45 UTC (10:45 SST) and had to be abandoned due to rising floods before being completely destroyed a few hours later.

=== American Samoa ===
Despite passing about 160 km (100 mi) to the west of Pago Pago, Cyclone Ofa affected American Samoa between 3 and 5 February with wind gusts of up to 160 km/h (100 mph), which caused widespread and extensive damage to the territory. Ahead of the cyclone affecting the island nation, a gale warning was issued by the FMS for the American territory, while forecasting that very heavy rain, high seas and damaging sea swells would impact the area.

On 4 February, within the immediate aftermath of the cyclone, the lieutenant governor Galea'i Peni Poumele placed the whole of American Samoa under a state of emergency. Upon his return from an international conference, the governor Peter Tali Coleman subsequently wrote to the United States president George H. W. Bush on 7 February, asking him to declare the islands a federal disaster area and asked for money to help the American territory rebuild and recover from the cyclone. The president subsequently declared the islands a major disaster area on December 9, which enabled Samoans to claim federal aid.

=== Tonga ===
During 2 February, the FMS issued a gale warning for Niuafo'ou and Niuatoputapu islands, while issuing the rest of Tonga with tropical cyclone alerts and a strong wind warning. During 3 February, as the system moved towards Tonga, the FMS predicted that it would pass about 55 km (35 mi) to the east of Niuatoputapu, at about 1100 UTC of 4 February, (0000 UTC+13, 5 February). As a result, the FMS issued a hurricane warning for Niuatoputapu and gale warnings for the rest of Tonga. Ofa subsequently moved more towards the southeast than expected and passed about 110 km (70 mi) to the east of Niuatoputapu. As a result, the Haapai and Tongatapu island groups did not receive any gale-force winds from the system, while Niuatoputapu only experienced storm force winds from the system. Severe damage to houses, church buildings, coconut plantations, food crops and other vegetation, was reported on the islands of Tafahi and Niuatoputapu. Over 70% of the housing in Niuatoputapu was completely destroyed, while the roofs of the remaining 30% were partially or completely damaged. On Niuafo'ou a moderate amount of damage was reported, but was generally confined to crops and vegetation. One death was attributed to Ofa on Niuafo'ou, while overall the system caused about US$3.2 million in damage to Tonga.

=== Niue ===
Early on 4 February, the island nation of Niue was placed under a gale warning, as gale-force winds or stronger were forecast to occur over the island nation during the next day. A hurricane warning was subsequently issued later that day, after the system had accelerated towards the south-southeast and started to affect Niue. As winds on the island picked up the telecommunications center shut down its operations, while the satellite dish on the island was taken down. Radio New Zealand subsequently broadcast Special Weather Bulletins for Niue on air, after being requested to by the FMS and the NZMS. The island was affected by hurricane-force winds for several hours on 5 February, as Ofa's eye passed about 30 km (20 mi) to west of the island. At around 03:00 UTC Niue recorded what was its lowest ever recorded pressure of 962.4 hPa (28.42 inHg). Very high seas which reportedly were several meters high, swept over the islands northern and western coasts, with virtually all of the landings to the sea washed away or badly damaged. Considerable damage was recorded to the islands hospital, hotel, roads, houses, churches and other facilities for public use. Due to the damage to the power lines, electricity was out for about 24 hours. Most of the islands private water supply tanks were contaminated by saltwater and declared unsuitable for drinking. There were lives lost or significant injuries reported, while the total loss on the island from the cyclone was estimated at around US$2.5 million. Within the aftermath of the cyclone the Royal New Zealand Air Force flights brought in emergency medical supplies, generators, water and fuel pumps, and food to Niue while a New Zealand navy vessel, the Endeavour, delivered additional foodstuffs, as well as building and plumbing materials, two weeks after the storm.

== See also ==
- 1889 Apia cyclone
- Cyclone Val
- Cyclone Heta
