= 2026 United States House of Representatives election in American Samoa =

2026 United States House of Representatives election in American Samoa, at-large district
- November 3, 2026
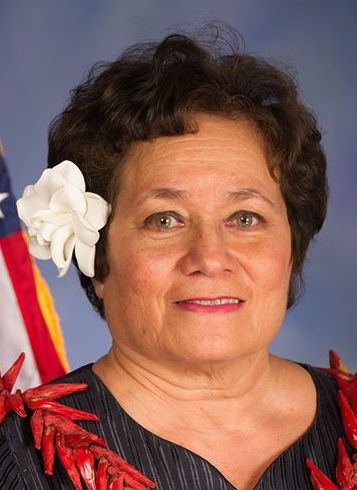

Candidate	Amata Coleman Radewagen	Sandra King-Young
Party	Republican	Democratic
Popular vote	4,215	2,169
Percentage	60.66%	31.22%
- Results by voting district Radewagen: 40–50% 50–60% 60–70% 70–80% Tie: 30–40%
Delegate at-large before election
Amata Coleman Radewagen
Republican
Elected Delegate at-large
Amata Coleman Radewagen
Republican

An election was held on November 3, 2026, to elect the non-voting delegate to the United States House of Representatives from American Samoa's at-large congressional district. The election coincided with races for other federal and American Samoan territorial offices, including the larger American Samoa general election, as well as the nationwide 2026 United States House of Representatives elections and the 2026 United States elections.

Both major parties faced uncontested primaries. In the general election incumbent Republican delegate Amata Coleman Radewagen defeated Democratic challenger Sandra King-Young.

== Republican primary ==
=== Candidates ===
==== Filed paperwork ====
- Amata Coleman Radewagen, incumbent representative

=== Endorsements ===
Amata Coleman Radewagen

Organizations

- Maggie's List

=== Fundraising ===
Campaign finance reports as of June 30, 2026
Candidate	Raised	Spent	Cash on hand
Amata Coleman Radewagen	$39,216	$36,603	$4,268
Source: Federal Election Commission

== Democratic primary ==
=== Candidates ===
==== Filed paperwork ====
- Sandra King-Young, former director of the American Samoa Medicaid State Agency and former Democratic National Committeewoman from American Samoa

=== Endorsements ===
Sandra King-Young

Political parties

- American Samoa Democratic Party

== Independents ==
=== On ballot ===
- Fualaau Rosie Tago-Lancaster
- Meleagi Suitonu Chapman
- Tuifagaloa Dr. Afu Lefaoseu

=== Removed from ballot ===
- Samana Semo Ve’ave’a, U.S. Army veteran (died October 19, 2026)

== General election ==
=== Fundraising ===
Campaign finance reports as of October 14, 2026
Candidate	Raised	Spent	Cash on hand
Amata Coleman Radewagen	$60,716	$58,027	$4,346
Source: Federal Election Commission

=== Results ===
2026 American Samoa's at-large delegate election
Party	Candidate	Votes	%	±%
Republican	Amata Coleman Radewagen (incumbent)	4,215	60.66	▼14.12
Democratic	Sandra King-Young	2,169	31.22	▲12.61
Independent	Tuifagaloa Dr. Afu Lefaoseu	316	4.55	N/A
Independent	Fualaau Rosie Tago-Lancaster	140	2.01	N/A
Independent	Meleagi Suitonu Chapman	108	1.55	N/A
Total votes		6,948	100.00	
Republican hold				
