= American Samoa Power Authority =

The American Samoa Power Authority (ASPA) is a government-run public utility company providing electricity, water, wastewater, and waste disposal services within American Samoa.

== History ==
Governor Peter T. Coleman issued an emergency executive order on October 1, 1981, which established the American Samoa Power Authority (ASPA). The 1970s and 1980s experienced frequent power outages. Supply failed to meet demand. Appeals to Washington, DC resulted in an appropriation of $1.5 million. Governor Coleman and Congressman Fofó Iosefa Fiti Sunia appealed to congressional committees for an emergency appropriation. In 1982, Congress approved $2 million out of the $8 requested. ASPA hired a new director, Jim Carrier, who urged the immediate purchase of two large diesel engines to solve the immediate problem. The move worked, but the increased use of air conditioners led to new energy usage issues. Power outages happened again in 1985. The new management in 1986 sought financial assistance from several sources and received loans from the Rural Electric Authority and the Retirement Fund. Success was immediate. In 1987, the territory's garbage disposal was transferred to ASPA.

In 1995, Department of the Interior gave the Government of American Samoa a five-year grant to develop a master plan for the development of sewer, water, roads, and power services for Tuālāuta County. ASPA received a $3.1 million grant from the EPA for the first phase of the Tafuna plains sewer system. The Master Plan for Port Development was completed. By the year 2000, ASPA was in control of all power distribution and generation, water systems, wastewater, and solid waste disposal.

In 2008 the American Samoa Senate proposed the dissolution of the ASPA in 2008 due to financial difficulties. Under the bill, the ASPA would be dissolved and its assets and operations would be transferred to a new proposed American Samoa Utility Department overseen by the Executive Branch. The bill was defeated in March 2008.
