= Save Liuato Tuitele =

Save Liuato Afa Tuitele is an American Samoan retired judge and politician. He was one of six candidates for Governor of American Samoa in the 2012 gubernatorial election.

== Biography ==
=== Personal life ===
Tuitele was born in Leloaloa, American Samoa, the son of Save Afa Tuitele, who was from Leone on the main island of Tutuila, and Agatele Tigilau Tuitele, who was originally from Ta'u in the Manu'a Islands. He was raised in Leone, American Samoa, the home village of his father. Tuitele attended Midkiff Elementary School and graduated from the Marist Brothers School in Le'ala, American Samoa. He graduated from Samoana High School in 1965. He and his wife, the former Sarah M. Haleck, have four children and twelve grandchildren.

He attended college while serving in the United States Army, receiving a bachelor's degree in criminal justice administration from Chaminade University of Honolulu and a second bachelor's in business administration from McKendree University.

=== Career ===
Tuitele is a retired Chief Warrant Officer for the United States Army, serving for thirty years until his retirement in 2004.

Tuitele then served as an Associate Justice of the High Court of American Samoa until his retirement from the bench in 2011 to pursue a gubernatorial bid in 2012.

== 2012 gubernatorial election ==
Utu Abe Malae, who placed second to Governor Togiola Tulafono in the 2008 gubernatorial election, initially picked Tuitele as his running mate for Lieutenant Governor of American Samoa in the 2012 gubernatorial election. However, Malae, who was serving as the Director of the Northern Marianas Commonwealth Utility Corporation at the time, was forced to withdraw from the race in October 2011 and return to his position in the Northern Mariana Islands Malae had announced his resignation from utility to pursue the 2012 election, but his potential successor as Director was unacceptable to U.S. federal authorities.

Save Liuato Tuitele, who had been Malae's running mate before he dropped out of the race, decided to pursue his own candidacy for Governor of American Samoa. Tuitele was the third candidate to announce his intention to run for governor in 2012. He chose Tofoitaufa Sandra King-Young as his running mate for Lieutenant Governor. King Young, who served as the acting Director of the Office of Insular Affairs under President Bill Clinton, is the founder and CEO of the Pacific Islands Center for Educational Development. Tuitele ran against five other gubernatorial candidates in the election.

In September 2012, the Tuitele and King Young campaign challenged the eligibility of four other candidates for Governor and Lieutenant Governor, arguing that the four candidates did not leave their government positions before beginning their political campaigns, as required by American Samoan law. The candidates challenged were two gubernatorial candidates Lolo Letalu Moliga and Salu Hunkin-Finau, as well as Lt. Governor candidates Taufete'e Faumuina Jr. and Le'i Sonny Thompson. The motion to dismiss their candidacies was heard by the High Court of American Samoa, which turned down the petition, allowing all candidates to remain in the election.

The 2012 gubernatorial election will be held on November 6, 2012.
