= 1990 American Samoan gubernatorial veto referendum =

American Samoan ballot measure

A referendum on restricting the veto power of the governor was held in American Samoa on 7 November 1990. The proposal was rejected by 75% of voters.

== Results ==
Choice	Votes	%
For		25
Against		75
Total		
Source: Direct Democracy

== Aftermath ==
Following the referendum, Governor Peter Tali Coleman stated that he favoured the territory becoming autonomous and would negotiate with the United States.
