= 2018 American Samoan general election =

- November 6, 2018
- Delegate election
- Turnout: 55.58%
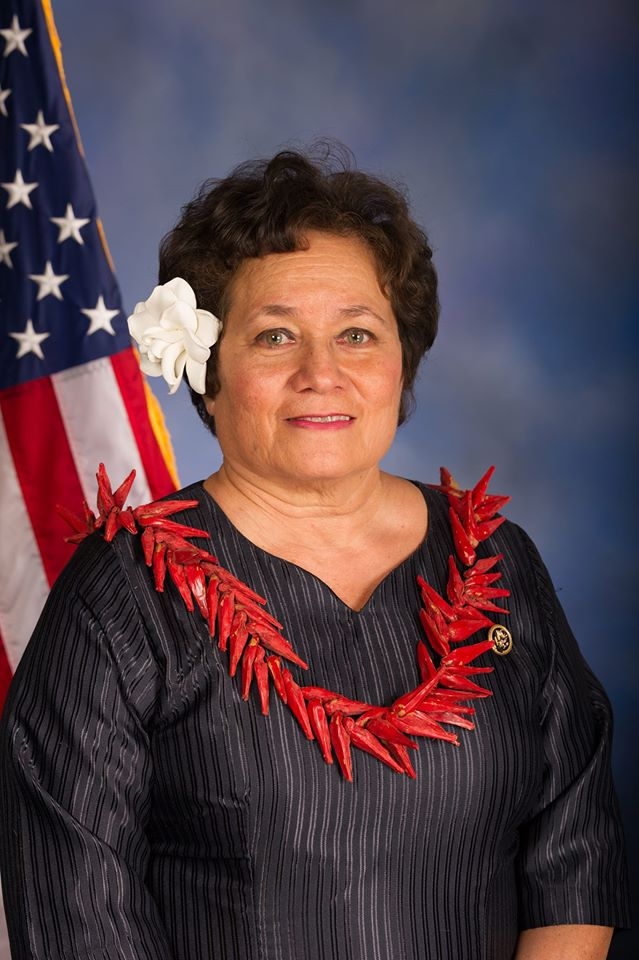

Candidate	Amata Coleman Radewagen	Tuika Tuika	Meleagi Suitonu-Chapman
Party	Republican	Independent	Democratic
Popular vote	7,194	785	659
Percentage	83.3%	9.1%	7.6%
- Results by voting district: Radewagen: 70–75% 75–80% 80–85% 85–90% 90–95% Radewagen/Suitonu-Chapman tie
Delegate before election
Amata Coleman Radewagen
Republican
Elected Delegate
Amata Coleman Radewagen
Republican

General elections were held in American Samoa on Tuesday, November 6, 2018, to elect members of the Fono and the non-voting delegate to the United States House of Representatives from the territory's at-large congressional district. The elections coincided with the nationwide 2018 United States House of Representatives elections and the wider 2018 United States elections.

Incumbent delegate Amata Coleman Radewagen, a Republican who had held the seat since 2015, won re-election to the United States House of Representatives for a third term.

== Background ==
In November 2014 Amata Coleman Radewagen defeated 10-term incumbent Democratic Rep. Eni Faleomavaega in a crowded race for the seat. She won re-election to a second term in 2016.

== Delegate candidates ==
The deadline for candidates to file with the Election Office was September 1, 2018. Three candidates filed to run for election to American Samoa's lone seat in the United States House of Representatives by the deadline.

=== Democratic ===
- Meleagi Suitonu-Chapman, retired U.S. federal government employee

=== Independents ===
- Tuika Tuika, accountant, civil servant and politician, former candidate for governor of American Samoa (2008, 2016)

=== Republican ===
- Amata Coleman Radewagen, incumbent delegate for the United States House of Representatives

== Results ==
=== Delegate ===
Candidate	Party	Votes	%
Amata Coleman Radewagen	Republican Party	7,194	83.28
Tuika Tuika	Independent	785	9.09
Meleagi Suitonu-Chapman	Democratic Party	659	7.63
Total		8,638	100.00
Source: Samoa News
