= A. P. Lutali =

American Samoan politician

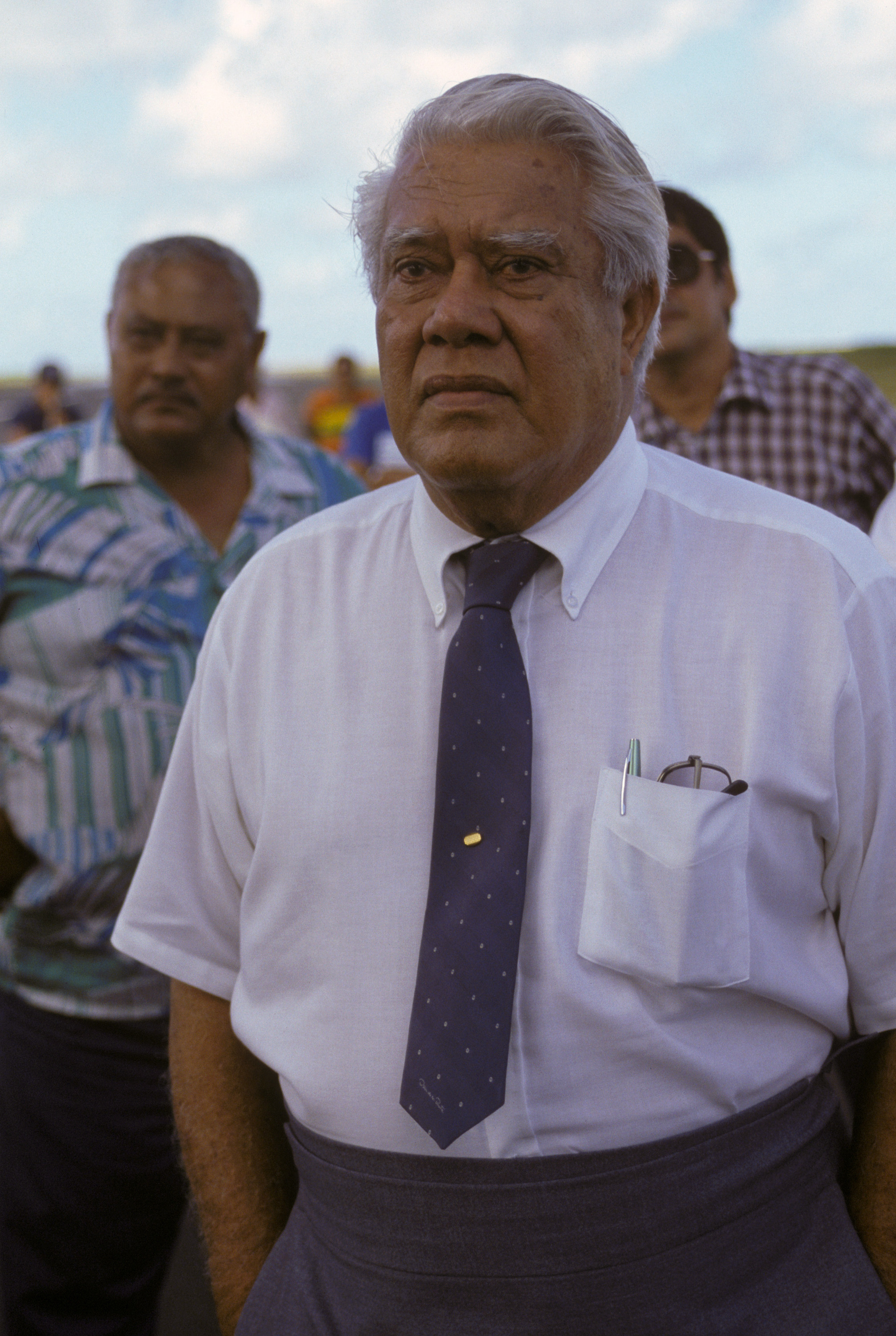

2nd & 4th Governor of American Samoa
- In office January 3, 1993 – January 3, 1997
- Lieutenant: Tauese Sunia
- Preceded by: Peter Tali Coleman
- Succeeded by: Tauese Sunia
- In office January 3, 1985 – January 2, 1989
- Lieutenant: Eni Faleomavaega
- Preceded by: Peter Tali Coleman
- Succeeded by: Peter Tali Coleman

Delegate at-large of American Samoa
- In office January 3, 1975 – January 3, 1979
- Preceded by: A. U. Fuimaono
- Succeeded by: Fofō Sunia

Personal details
- Born: Aifili Paulo Lutali; December 24, 1919 Aunu'u, American Samoa, U.S.
- Died: August 1, 2002 (aged 82) Pago Pago, American Samoa, U.S.
- Party: Democratic
- Spouse: Susana Leiato Lutali (m. 1954)
- Children: 9
- Education: University of Hawaii, Manoa

Aifili Paulo Lauvao (December 24, 1919 – August 1, 2002), was twice governor of American Samoa (1985–1989, 1993–1997). The founder of the U.S territory's Democratic Party, he had a long career in the legislature and the judiciary in American Samoa.

Governor Lutali was a preservationist who wanted to preserve large areas of the territory's nature. Lutali also worked to preserve American Samoa's ancient sites and historical buildings. He revitalized the Historic Preservation Office. In 1987, Governor Lutali initiated efforts to create a national park in American Sāmoa. After 18 months of preparatory work, he testified before the U.S. House Subcommittee on National Parks in Washington, D.C., leading to a unanimous House vote to establish the National Park of American Samoa.

Lutali maintained a leading role in the American Samoa Democratic Party through the years. Lutali served as a sergeant in the First Samoan Battalion during World War II, helped establish Samoana High School, later became Speaker of the House of Representatives and President of the American Samoa Senate, served as American Samoa’s second delegate to Washington, D.C., and was the second elected Governor of American Samoa.

== Biography ==
=== Education ===
From 1951 to 1954, Lutali served as administrative supervisor for public schools. He was chairman of the Samoan Culture Curriculum Committee from 1952 to 1954, a member of the Board of Education from 1955 to 1958, and chairman of the first American Samoa Board of Higher Education, which established the American Samoa Community College, Mapusaga, in 1974. He was admitted to practice in the High Court of American Samoa in 1954 and was one of the founders of the American Samoa Bar Association in 1972. He was appointed a permanent judge of the high court in 1972, and later as chief judge of the Lands and Titles Division.

=== Political career ===
Lutali was elected to the American Samoa House of Representatives in 1955 and served as its speaker in 1955–58. He was a member of the 1966 Constitutional Convention and was American Samoa's Delegate to Congress from 1975 to 1979. He was elected to the American Samoa Senate in 1977 and was elected its president in his first year, serving in the senate concurrent to his four-year term as delegate. He ran unsuccessfully for Governor in the 1977 American Samoan gubernatorial election, losing to Peter Tali Coleman. In 1978 he announced he would not seek another term as delegate.

He was first elected governor of American Samoa in 1984 and lost his bid for a second term in 1988. In 1989, he was returned by his district (Sa'ole) to the Senate where he served as chairman of the Committee on Government Operations until he was again elected governor in 1992. Lutali played a key role in working with Samoan chiefs and the U.S. Congress to create the 50th national park of the United States in American Samoa. He lost his bid for a third term as governor in the 1996 elections.

=== Death ===
Lutali suffered a stroke and was admitted to LBJ Medical Center. He died on August 1, 2002.

=== Legacy ===
Lutali's political career began in 1953 when he was elected to the Saʻole County seat in the first ever elected American Samoa House of Representatives (3rd Legislature). He was a signatory of the first American Samoa Constitution in 1960 and later chaired the 1966 Constitutional Convention, which produced the current 1967 Revised Constitution. His administration is remembered for its initiatives in public health, youth development, and environmental protection, including his strong opposition to nuclear testing in the Pacific region. As Governor, he initiated several private self-help business programs. He was instrumental in establishing Samoana High School, the first high school in American Samoa, in 1946. His commitment to education extended to higher learning; he chaired the first American Samoa Board of Higher Education, leading to the creation of the American Samoa Community College in 1974. Two years later, in 1976, he founded the American Samoa Democratic Party.

He was involved in the establishment of the American Samoa Power Authority (ASPA) and played a significant role in the creation of the National Park of American Samoa. His efforts contributed to the modernization of public services and the preservation of the territory's natural resources. He was a founding member of the American Samoa Bar Association. After his defeat in the 1996 gubernatorial election, Lutali continued to serve in the American Samoa Senate, where he was involved in various community projects, including the construction of the Senior Citizen Center that now bears his name. In recognition of his lifelong service, he received an Outstanding Achievement Award from the government in 1997.

The A. P. Lutali Elementary School on the island of Aunu'u is named in his honor. The A P Lutali Executive Office Building in Utulei is also named after him.

== Sources ==
- Rulers.org

U.S. House of Representatives
Preceded by A. U. Fuimaono	Delegate at-large of American Samoa; 1975–1979	Succeeded by Fofō Sunia
Party political offices
First	Democratic nominee for Governor of American Samoa; 1977, 1980, 1984, 1988, 1992	Succeeded by Tauese Sunia
Political offices
Preceded by Peter Tali Coleman	Governor of American Samoa; 1985–1989	Succeeded by Peter Tali Coleman
Preceded by Peter Tali Coleman	Governor of American Samoa; 1993–1997	Succeeded by Tauese Sunia
