= Naval Governor =

Naval Governor may refer to:

- Naval Governor of American Samoa, the territorial executive of American Samoa
- Naval Governor of Guam, the territorial executive of Guam
