= A. U. Fuimaono =

American politician

Delegate at-large from American Samoa
- In office January 3, 1971 – January 3, 1975
- Preceded by: Office established
- Succeeded by: A. P. Lutali

Member of the American Samoa Senate
- In office 1985–1992
- In office 1975–1978
- Preceded by: Lualemaga Faoliu

Personal details
- Born: Asuemu Ulufale Fuimaono; January 24, 1924 Fagaʻalu, American Samoa, U.S.
- Died: September 9, 2008 (aged 84) Fagaʻalu, American Samoa, U.S.
- Party: Democratic
- Spouse: Felefele Fuimaono
- Education: Feleti Memorial Teachers Training School

Asuemu Ulufale Fuimaono (January 24, 1924 – September 9, 2008) was an American Samoan politician and Paramount Chief who served as American Samoa's first Delegate-at-Large to the United States House of Representatives in a four-year term from 1971 until 1975. Fuimaono also served as the governor of Western District, American Samoa on the island of Tutuila from his appointment in 1993 until his death in 2008.

== Early life ==
A.U. Fuimaono was educated at the Marist Brothers Catholic School, Poyer School and Samoana High School. Fuimaono went on to obtain his teaching certification from Feleti Memorial Teachers Training School.

Fuimaono enlisted and served in the United States Navy for four years.

== Career ==
=== Early career ===
Fuimaono was a full Samoan chief. Fuimaono helped to establish the first Political Status Commission, which was held in 1969. He was for a time the USDA director in American Samoa.

=== Delegate to the United States House of Representatives ===
Fuimaono was elected as American Samoa's first Delegate to the United States House of Representatives in 1970. As Fuimaono was not a sworn member of the U.S. House of Representatives, he worked more like an elected lobbyist for the islands including testifying to the U.S. House Committee on Interior and Insular Affairs to advocate for American Samoa's issues. As delegate he was instrumental in reversing a temporary ban on the recruitment of American Samoans by the United States Army.

=== American Samoan government ===
Fuimaono left Washington D.C. in 1974 and returned to American Samoa. He was elected to the American Samoa Senate in 1975 as a replacement for Lualemaga Faoliu, and served in the 14th and 15th American Samoan Legislatures. During this tenure, Fuimaono also served as President of the Senate for 18 months.

He unsuccessfully contested the 1977 American Samoan gubernatorial election, coming third in the first round. Following the election he left the Senate to take up a position in the Cabinet of Governor Peter Tali Coleman. He returned to the Senate following the end of his Cabinet position. He served again in the Senate from 1985 until 1992 during the 19th, 20th, 21st and 22nd American Samoan Legislatures. Ultimately, Fuimaono served in all three branches of the American Samoan government, including as a legal advisor on Samoan matters within the territorial Judiciary.

=== Governor of Western District ===
Fuimaono was appointed governor of Western District, American Samoa in 1993. He served as governor until his death in 2008. Fuimaono was unable to attend many public events in 2008 due to failing health.

=== Other roles ===
Fuimaono also sat on the board of directors for a number of American Samoan committees and organizations throughout his career. He served as Chairman of the Congregational Christian Church of American Samoa. He also worked as chairman of the American Samoa Red Cross, Chairman of the Boy Scouts of America Samoa's Aloha Council and Chairman of Future Farmers of Samoa.

At one point, Fuimaono joined StarKist Tuna as the company's Director of Government and Industrial Relations in the private sector. StarKist Tuna has a large cannery and processing facilities in American Samoa.

== Honors ==
Fuimaono was awarded the Governor's Humanitarian Award in 2000. The award, which is sponsored by the Amerika Samoa Humanities Council was established in 1996 by former Governor A.P. Lutali. Fuimaono was given the honor for his role as a church, governmental and traditional Samoan leader.

== Death ==
A.U. Fuimaono died on September 9, 2008, at LBJ Tropical Medical Center in Faga'alu, American Samoa, at the age of 85.

The American Samoa Senate observed a moment of silence in Fuimaono's honor during its session on September 10, 2008. Governor Togiola Tulafono ordered all American flags lowered to half-staff.

Tributes poured in from across American Samoa. American Samoa Governor Togiola Tulafono said that American Samoa had lost a great leader, "We will forever be grateful to his leadership, dedication and contribution. He will be greatly missed." Representative Eni Faleomavaega said that Fuimaono "was like a father to me."

U.S. House of Representatives
New constituency	Delegate at-large of American Samoa; 1971–1975	Succeeded by A. P. Lutali
