= Governor Coleman =

Governor Coleman may refer to:

- James P. Coleman (1914–1991), 52nd Governor of Mississippi
- Peter Tali Coleman (1919–1997), 1st and 3rd Governor of American Samoa
