= Amata Coleman Radewagen =

American Samoan politician (born 1947)

Aumua Amata Radewagen
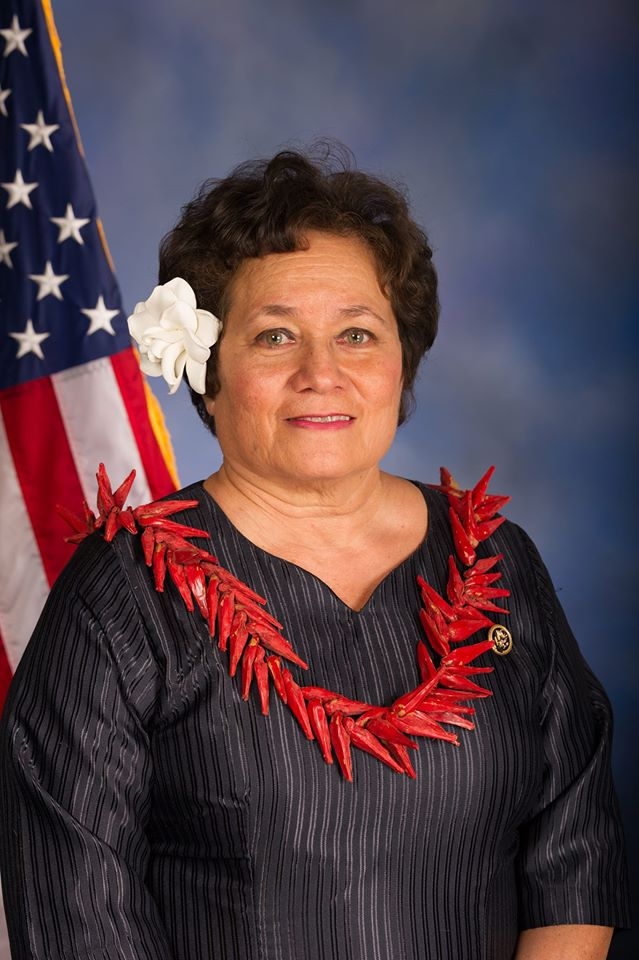
- Official portrait, 2015

Delegate to the U.S. House of Representatives from American Samoa's at-large district
- Incumbent
- Assumed office January 3, 2015
- Preceded by: Eni Faleomavaega

Personal details
- Born: Amata Catherine Coleman; December 29, 1947 (age 78) Washington, D.C., U.S.
- Party: Republican (before 2012, 2014–present); Constitution (2012–2014)
- Spouse: Fred Radewagen
- Children: 3
- Relatives: Peter Coleman (father); Nora Stewart (mother)
- Education: University of Guam (BS); George Mason University (attended); Loyola Marymount University (attended)
- Website: House website Campaign website
- Radewagen's voice Radewagen applauding Pacific nations for condemning the Russian invasion of Ukraine. Recorded March 7, 2023

Amata Catherine Coleman Radewagen (/əˈmɑːtə, ˈrædəˌwæɡən/ ə-MAH-tə RAD-ə-WAG-ən; born December 29, 1947), commonly called Aumua Amata (/aʊˈmuːə/ ow-MOO-ə), is an American Samoan politician who is the current delegate for the United States House of Representatives from American Samoa. Radewagen, a Republican, was elected on November 4, 2014, after defeating Democratic incumbent Eni Faleomavaega; she was the first-ever Republican delegate since the office had been created in 1970 and began her tenure on January 3, 2015. She also serves as the national committeewoman for the Republican Party of American Samoa. Amata is the first woman to represent American Samoa in the U.S. Congress.

By winning 75.4% of the vote in her 2016 re-election, Aumua Amata attained the highest number of votes in American Samoa history. She won reelection with 83.3 percent of the votes in a three-way race in 2018.

She has been the scheduling director for the United States House of Representatives majority leadership for eight years. Radewagen has been the most senior member of the Republican National Committee since 2012. She was a member of both the executive committee for the 2016–17 presidential transition and the executive committee for the 2017 Republican National Committee Chairman's Transition Committee.

== Early life and education ==
Amata Catherine Coleman Radewagen is the daughter of Peter Tali Coleman, the first popularly-elected Governor of American Samoa, and Nora Stewart Coleman, the former First Lady of American Samoa. Her father was Samoan and English American; her mother was of Chinese, German, Native Hawaiian, and Scottish descent. Radewagen has twelve siblings. She attended Sacred Hearts Academy in Honolulu, Hawaii, for secondary education and graduated with a degree in psychology from the University of Guam in 1975. She also took classes at Loyola Marymount University in Los Angeles, California, and George Mason University in Fairfax, Virginia.

She married Fred Radewagen in December 1971. The couple has three children and two grandchildren. Radewagen holds the orator (talking chief) title of Aumua from the capital of Pago Pago—her hometown and where she is a registered voter. From 1984 to 1997, Amata was the chief diplomatic correspondent for the Washington Pacific Report.

== Political career ==
Aumua Amata has been an executive assistant to the first Delegate-at-Large from American Samoa.

From 1997 to 1999, Radewagen served on the staff of United States Representative Phil Crane of Illinois. She served on the staff of United States Representative J. C. Watts, Jr. of Oklahoma from 1999 to 2003. After that, she served on the staff of the House Republican Conference from 2003 to 2005. Radewagen first ran for Congress in the 1994 elections against Democrat Eni F. H. Faleomavaega. She failed to gain the nomination of the Republican Party of American Samoa in 1996 and 2000, and she ran as an independent in the 1998 elections.

Radewagen was appointed in 2001, by President George W. Bush, as a Commissioner on the President's Advisory Commission on Asian Americans and Pacific Islanders (AAPI); she chaired the Community Security Committee. Radewagen was the only Pacific Islander on the 15-member commission.

Since 1994, Radewagen has participated in every federal election. She was the first woman to run for the delegate position. Since 1986, she has represented the American Samoa Republican Party in the Republican National Committee. Radewagen is the most senior member.

In 2019, she was reappointed by President Donald Trump to serve on the President's Advisory Commission for Asian Americans and Pacific Islanders for a second stint.

== United States House of Representatives ==
=== 2014 election ===
Radewagen ran for American Samoa's at-large congressional district in the 2014 elections. She defeated the Democratic incumbent Delegate Eni Faleomavaega, 42% to 31%; former Democratic governor Togiola Tulafono finished third at 11% in the nine-way contest.

=== 2016 election ===
Radewagen was re-elected in 2016, receiving the highest number of votes in American Samoa history for any elective office, winning 75.4% of the vote cast.

=== Tenure ===
Radewagen assumed office on January 3, 2015. Upon taking office, she became the Republican Party's highest-ranking Asian-Pacific federal officeholder in the United States.

Radewagen has a bipartisan track record. She was ranked the 28th and 14th most bipartisan Representative in the 114th and 115th United States Congresses, respectively, by The Lugar Center and McCourt School of Public Policy's Bipartisan Index.

=== Committee assignments ===
- Committee on Foreign Affairs
  - Subcommittee on Global Health, Global Human Rights, and International Organizations
  - Subcommittee on the Indo-Pacific (vice chair)
- Committee on Natural Resources
  - Subcommittee on Indian, Insular and Alaska Native Affairs
  - Subcommittee on Water, Wildlife and Fisheries
- Committee on Veterans' Affairs (vice chair)
  - Subcommittee on Oversight and Investigations
  - Subcommittee on Health

=== Caucus memberships ===
- Congressional Western Caucus
- Climate Solutions Caucus
- Congressional Caucus on Turkey and Turkish Americans

=== Election results ===
- Note: Elections in American Samoa are nonpartisan and candidates are not listed with party affiliation. Partisan identification is for informational purposes

2024 American Samoa Delegate to the United States House of Representatives election
Party	Candidate	Votes	%
Republican	Amata Coleman Radewagen (inc.)	7,394	74.8%
Independent	Luisa Kuaea	1,840	18.6%
Democratic	Fualaau Rosie Lancaster	469	4.7%
Democratic	Meleagi Suitonu-Chapman	185	1.9%
Total votes		9,888	100.0%

2022 American Samoa Delegate to the United States House of Representatives election
Party	Candidate	Votes	%
Republican	Amata Coleman Radewagen (inc.)	6,637	100.0%
Total votes		6,637	100.0%

2020 American Samoa Delegate to the United States House of Representatives election
Party	Candidate	Votes	%
Republican	Amata Coleman Radewagen (inc.)	9,880	83.5%
Democratic	Oreta Crichton	1,704	14.4%
Democratic	Meleagi Suitonu-Chapman	249	2.1%
Total votes		11,833	100.0%

2018 American Samoa Delegate to the United States House of Representatives election
Party	Candidate	Votes	%
Republican	Amata Coleman Radewagen (inc.)	7,194	83.3%
Independent	Tuika Tuika	785	9.1%
Democratic	Meleagi Suitonu–Chapman	659	7.6%
Total votes		8,638	100.0%

2016 American Samoa Delegate to the United States House of Representatives election
Party	Candidate	Votes	%
Republican	Amata Coleman Radewagen (inc.)	8,924	75.4%
Democratic	Salu Hunkin-Finau	1,581	13.4%
Democratic	Mapu Jamias	978	8.3%
Democratic	Meleagi Suitonu-Chapman	181	1.5%
Independent	Timothy Jones	171	1.4%
Total votes		11,835	100.0%
Republican hold			

2014 American Samoa Delegate to the United States House of Representatives election
Party	Candidate	Votes	%
Republican	Amata Coleman Radewagen	4,306	42.0%
Democratic	Eni F. H. Faleomavaega (inc.)	3,157	30.8%
Democratic	Togiola Tulafono	1,130	11.0%
Democratic	Mapu S. Jamias	652	6.4%
Independent	Rosie Fuala‘au Tago Lancaster	286	2.6%
Independent	Meleagi Suitonu-Chapman	229	2.2%
Independent	Tuika Tuika	201	2.0%
Democratic	Tu‘au Kereti Mata‘Utia Jr	160	1.6%
Independent	Mark Ude	143	1.4%
Total votes		10,246	100.0%

2012 American Samoa Delegate to the United States House of Representatives election
Party	Candidate	Votes	%
Democratic	Eni F. H. Faleomavaega (inc.)	7,221	55.2%
Constitution	Amata Coleman Radewagen	4,420	33.8%
Independent	Rosie Fuala‘au Tago Lancaster	697	5.3%
Democratic	Kereti Mata‘utia Jr	438	3.3%
Independent	Fatumalala Leulua‘iali‘i A. Al-Sheri	300	2.3%
Total votes		13,076	100.0%

2010 American Samoa Delegate to the United States House of Representatives election
Party	Candidate	Votes	%
Democratic	Eni F. H. Faleomavaega (inc.)	6,182	56.4%
Republican	Amata Coleman Radewagen	4,422	40.3%
Independent	Tuika Tuika	356	3.3%
Total votes		10,960	100.0%

2008 American Samoa Delegate to the United States House of Representatives election
Party	Candidate	Votes	%
Democratic	Eni F. H. Faleomavaega (inc.)	7,499	60.4%
Republican	Amata Coleman Radewagen	4,350	35.0%
Independent	Rosie Fuala‘au Tago Lancaster	570	4.6%
Total votes		12,419	100.0%

2006 American Samoa Delegate to the United States House of Representatives election
Party	Candidate	Votes	%
Democratic	Eni F. H. Faleomavaega (inc.)	5,195	47.1%
Republican	Amata Coleman Radewagen	4,493	40.7%
Independent	Ae Ae Muavaefaatasi Jr.	1,345	12.2%
Total votes		11,033	100.0%

2004 American Samoa Delegate to the United States House of Representatives election
Party	Candidate	Votes	%
Democratic	Eni F. H. Faleomavaega (inc.)	6,656	54.9%
Republican	Amata Coleman Radewagen	5,472	45.1%
Total votes		12,128	100.0%

2002 American Samoa Delegate to the United States House of Representatives election (General November 5, 2002 & Runoff November 19, 2002)
Party	Candidate	Votes	%
Democratic	Eni F. H. Faleomavaega (inc.)	4,294	41.3%
Independent	Fagafaga D. Langkilde	3,332	32.1%
Republican	Amata Coleman Radewagen	2,767	26.6%
Total votes		10,393	100.0%
General election
Democratic	Eni F. H. Faleomavaega (inc.)	4,959	54.8%
Independent	Fagafaga D. Langkilde	4,083	45.2%
Total votes		9,042	100.0%

1998 American Samoa Delegate to the United States House of Representatives election
Party	Candidate	Votes	%
Democratic	Eni F. H. Faleomavaega (inc.)	8,138	80.8%
Independent	Seigafolava Robert Pene	1,273	12.7%
Independent	Amata Coleman Radewagen	651	6.5%
Total votes		10,062	100.0%

1994 American Samoa Delegate to the United States House of Representatives election
Party	Candidate	Votes	%
Democratic	Eni F. H. Faleomavaega (inc.)	6,517	63.5%
Republican	Amata Coleman Radewagen	2,116	20.6%
Independent	Fal‘ivae Apelu Galea‘i	1,299	12.7%
Independent	Tuika Tuika	324	3.2%
Total votes		10,256	100.0%

== Other activity ==
Radewagen has been involved in helping build democratic institutions internationally. As a trainer since 1992, she has participated in missions to Kazakhstan, Cambodia, Kyrgyzstan, and Morocco for the International Republican Institute and the International Foundation for Electoral Systems, among other activities. She began advocating on behalf of breast cancer awareness after being diagnosed with breast cancer in 1993.

She is a founding member of the American Samoa Society and a life member of the Capitol Hill Club. She has also been a member of organizations such as the Guam Society of America, Hawaii State Society, Women's Foreign Policy Group, and the Independent Women's Forum. She is a current member of the Pan Pacific and Southeast Asia Women's Association. In 2003, Radewagen became the first Pacific Islander chosen as “Outstanding Woman of the Year” by the National Association of Professional Asian American Women (NAPAW). In 2008, she received the International Leadership Foundation's Visionary Award. In 2013, she received both the Inspirational Speaker Award at the Samoan Athletes Heart of Champions Ceremony in La Mesa, CA, as well as the Trailblazer Award from the Republican National Convention. She is a current board member at the Field House 100 American Samoa.

== See also ==
- List of Asian Americans and Pacific Islands Americans in the United States Congress
- Women in the United States House of Representatives
- Republican Party of American Samoa

U.S. House of Representatives
Preceded by Eni Faleomavaega	Delegate to the U.S. House of Representatives from American Samoa's at-large congressional district 2015–present	Incumbent
U.S. order of precedence (ceremonial)
Preceded by Stacey Plaskett	United States delegates by seniority 3rd	Succeeded by James Moylan
