= 2004 American Samoan general election =

- 2 November 2004 (first round); 16 November 2004 (second round)
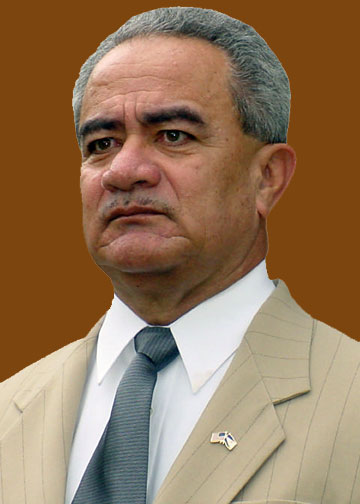

Nominee	Togiola Tulafono	Afoa Moega Lutu	Te'o J. Fuavai
Party	Democratic	Independent	Independent
First round	5,863 (48.45%)	4,767 (39.39%)	1,472 (12.16%)
Second round	6,407 (55.72%)	5,091 (44.28%)

General elections were held in American Samoa on November 2, 2004. A second round of the election for Governor was held on November 16.

== Results ==
=== Governor ===
Candidate	Running mate	Party	First round		Second round	
Candidate	Running mate	Party	Votes	%	Votes	%
Togiola Tulafono	Faoa Aitofele Sunia	Democratic Party	5,863	48.45	6,407	55.72
Afoa Moega Lutu	Taeaoafua Meki Solomona	Independent	4,767	39.39	5,091	44.28
Te'o J. Fuavai	Alo Paul Stevenson	Independents	1,472	12.16		
Total			12,102	100.00	11,498	100.00

=== House of Representatives ===
District	Candidate	Votes	%
1 – Manuʻa	Mapu Puaopea F. Paopao	497	32.38
1 – Manuʻa	Mailo Saoluaga T. Nua	459	29.90
1 – Manuʻa	Fetu Fetui Jr.	339	22.08
1 – Manuʻa	Talalemotu F. Mauga	186	12.12
1 – Manuʻa	Maria Faasaei Alo Salevao	54	3.52
2 – Manuʻa	Fonoti Savali Vaeao	165	38.11
2 – Manuʻa	Toeaina Faufano Autele	136	31.41
2 – Manuʻa	Tauaola Malae	101	23.33
2 – Manuʻa	Tuanuutele R. Sai	31	7.16
3 – Vaifanua	Gaoteote Palaie Tofau	586	100
4 – Saole	Agaoleatu Charlie Tautolo	302	55.82
4 – Saole	Fepulea'i Sila Poasa	239	44.18
5 – Sua #1	Tuialofi Faalae Lauatuaa Tunupopo	221	40.63
5 – Sua #1	Tumuatasi L. Mulitauaopele	106	19.49
5 – Sua #1	Siliga Ketesemane Meaole	93	17.10
5 – Sua #1	Mark Tamatane Mageo-Aga	69	12.68
5 – Sua #1	Maeataanoa Susana Leiato-Lutali	55	10.11
6 – Sua #2	Limutau F. C. Limutau	182	52.30
6 – Sua #2	Tiaiu Sapu Semeatu Maiava	166	47.70
7 – Maoputasi #1	Tali T. Ma'ae	291	52.06
7 – Maoputasi #1	Su'a Carl Schuster	268	47.94
8 – Maoputasi #2	Matagi Ray Ma'ilo McMoore	302	55.41
8 – Maoputasi #2	Sipa L. Anoa'i	243	44.59
9 – Maoputasi #3	Ae Ae Jr.	497	59.24
9 – Maoputasi #3	Fiasili Puni E. Haleck	342	40.76
10 – Maoputasi #4	Taliutafa Liusa A. Young	140	54.26
10 – Maoputasi #4	Lemauga Petelo Uti	118	45.74
11 – Maoputasi #5	Paopaoailua J. Fiaui	389	78.43
11 – Maoputasi #5	Poe Suaava Jr.	107	21.57
12 – Ituau	Mary Lauagaia M. Taufetee	945	38.23
12 – Ituau	Fagasoaia F. Lealaitafea	781	31.59
12 – Ituau	Valasi Seanoa Gaisoa	746	30.18
13 – Fofo	Puletu Koko	392	42.61
13 – Fofo	Vaiausia Eliko Yandall	384	41.74
13 – Fofo	Leoo Nua Sipiliano	144	15.65
14 – Lealataua	Savali Talavou Ale	279	53.86
14 – Lealataua	Avalogo Jacinta Slater	239	46.14
15 – Tualauta	Pili	1,045	30.33
15 – Tualauta	Tagaloa Toloa Letuli	892	25.89
15 – Tualauta	Tulafono F. Solaita Jr.	547	15.87
15 – Tualauta	Leomiti Nuu Faitamai Leomiti	333	9.66
15 – Tualauta	Moana Hatcher	302	8.76
15 – Tualauta	Tugailelagi Atoa Sipili (Anytime)	230	6.67
15 – Tualauta	Samuelu S. Tinai	68	1.97
15 – Tualauta	Steven Lotonuu Siufanua	29	0.84
16 – Tualatai	Olo Ropati Atimalala Tagovailoa	388	56.98
16 – Tualatai	Faauaa Elisara P. Elisara	293	43.02
17 – Leasina	Atualevao Gafatasi Afalava	307	57.92
17 – Leasina	Wesley Tuilefano (Tuaolotele)	223	42.08

=== Delegate to the American House of Representatives ===
Results by voting district: Eni Faleomavaega: 50–55% 55–60% 60–65% 65–70% 70–75% Aumua Amata Coleman Radewagen: 50–55% 55–60% 60–65% 65–70%

Candidate	Party	Votes	%
Eni Faleomavaega	Democratic Party	6,656	54.88
Amata Coleman Radewagen	Republican Party	5,472	45.12
Total		12,128	100.00
