= Tufele Liamatua =

American Samoan politician (1940–2011)

2nd Lieutenant Governor of American Samoa
- In office January 3, 1978 – January 3, 1985
- Governor: Peter Tali Coleman
- Preceded by: Position re-established
- Succeeded by: Eni Faleomavaega

Personal details
- Born: September 4, 1940; American Samoa, U.S.
- Died: October 13, 2011 (aged 71); Honolulu, Hawaii, U.S.
- Political party: Republican
- Spouse: Tofiga

Tufele Faatoia Liamatua, also spelled Tufele Li'amatua, (September 1940 – October 13, 2011) was an American Samoan politician, businessman and paramount chief. He served as the first elected lieutenant governor of American Samoa under former Governor Peter Tali Coleman from 1978 to 1985.

The chiefly title of Tufele before Liamatua's name was bestowed on him by the village of Fitiuta in the Manu'a Islands. He was a paramount chief.

== Biography ==
=== Personal life ===
Tufele Liamatua was born in American Samoa. His 70th birthday gala was held on Saturday, September 4, 2010, at the Gov. H. Lee Auditorium. His wife, Tofiga, is a longtime nurse at LBJ Tropical Medical Center.

=== Lieutenant governor ===
U.S. Rep. Phillip Burton of California introduced a Bill on June 10, 1976, in the U.S. House of Representatives to allow for the popular election of the governor and lieutenant governor, rather than appointment by the Interior Secretary. The Bill passed the House by a 377–1 majority. American Samoa Governor Hyrum Rex Lee approved Public Law 15-23 on May 16, 1977, which called on the U.S. Secretary of the Interior to allow the direct election of the governor and lieutenant governor. On September 13, 1977, the Department of the Interior issued Order No. 3009 which provided a "Provision for Elected Governor and Lieutenant Governor, and Creation of Office of Government Comptroller". This paved the way for American Samoa's first popular gubernatorial election in November 1977.

Peter Tali Coleman, who had previously served as appointed governor during the 1950s, and his running mate, Tufele Liamatua, won the 1977 gubernatorial election on November 1, 1977, becoming the first directly elected governor and Lieutenant governor of American Samoa, respectively. Liamatua was inaugurated as Lieutenant Governor of American Samoa on January 3, 1978. Coleman and Liamatua successfully campaigned for a second full term in office in the 1980 gubernatorial election. Liamatua left office on January 3, 1985, and was succeeded by Eni Faleomavaega.

=== Public career ===
Liamatua later served as the governor of Manu'a District. He also held the position of police commissioner at one point.

Liamatua was appointed as the chairman of the Future Political Status Study Commission in 2006. American Samoan Senator Tuaolo Fruean was appointed the Vice Chairman of the commission. The commission was created to study the potential political status of American Samoa, which is currently classified as an unincorporated territory of the United States. Liamatua asked for an extended deadline for the commission's findings.

Liamatua called for full autonomy for American Samoa in November 2006, citing a list of political weaknesses which needed to be addressed by the Future Political Status Study Commission. Liamatua recognized that the Governor of American Samoa, elected by the people, could be removed by the U.S. Secretary of the Interior at any time. Liamatua also cited three other examples in his argument for complete autonomy for American Samoa. He reiterated that the United Nations lists American Samoa as a non-self governing territory. He also cited American Samoa's application to join the Pacific Islands Forum as an associate member by Governor Togiola Tulafono, which the U.S. State Department wanted to rescind because the application was not handled by the federal government. Finally, Laimatua criticized interference by the U.S. National Park Service on a deal negotiated by Governor Tulafono to construct a McDonald's restaurant on Utulei Beach.

In 2009, Governor Tulafono nominated Liamatua to the board of directors of the LBJ Medical Center. He was confirmed by the American Samoa Senate in a 14–2 vote. Liamatua was elected to the American Samoa House of Representatives in 2006, representing Su'a Number One District. He became the chairman of the House retirement and communications committees.

=== Secretary of Samoan Affairs ===
Governor Togiola Tulafono appointed Liamatua as Secretary of Samoan Affairs on January 7, 2009. He succeeded outgoing Secretary Mauga Tasi Asuega. Liamatua simultaneously became the head of the Department of Local Government upon his appointment to the office. Under American Samoan law, the Secretary of Samoan Affairs is selected and appointed by the governor from the territory's senior matai, or chiefs. The selection of the Samoan Affairs Secretary is the sole discretion of the governor and does not need the approval of the American Samoa Fono.

One of Liamatua's first duties as Samoan Affairs Secretary was to officiate the ava faatupu, which was held on January 9, 2009, for the second inauguration of Gov. Tulafono and Lt. Governor Ipulasi Aitofele Sunia. Secretary Liamatua is also charged with welcoming visiting dignitaries, including Secretary of State Hillary Clinton on her brief visit to American Samoa in November 2010.

On November 28, 2010, Secretary Liamatua called on the American Samoan community to help prevent the spread of HIV and AIDs in a keynote speech presented in the run-up to World AIDS Day at a Sunday church service.

=== Death ===
Tufele Liamatua died unexpectedly in Honolulu, Hawaii, on October 13, 2011, at the age of 71. He was flown back to American Samoa on board a Hawaiian Airlines flight on October 20, 2011.

Political offices
New office	Lieutenant Governor of American Samoa; 1978–1985	Succeeded by Eni Faleomavaega
Party political offices
Preceded by Peter Tali Coleman	Republican nominee for Governor of American Samoa; 1984	Succeeded by Peter Tali Coleman
