= Salu Hunkin-Finau =

Salu Hunkin-Finau (born ?) is an American Samoan educator, politician, and academic administrator. She is the former president of American Samoa Community College. In February 2012, Hunkin announced her candidacy for Governor of American Samoa in the November 2012 gubernatorial election, becoming the first female candidate for governor since 2000.

Hunkin was born in Vailoatai, American Samoa, to parents, the late Faauaa Eni Hunkin Sr. and Taualaitufanuaimeaatamalii Liufau Tufaga Manu. Hunkin is one of eight siblings, including her brother, Eni Faleomavaega, who has served as Delegate to the United States House of Representatives from American Samoa's at-large congressional district from 1989 through 2014.

She graduated from Kahuku High School, located on the North Shore of Oahu in Hawaii, and received her doctorate in education from the University of Hawaii. Hunkin, who is married to Alataua Tavita Finau, has ten children.

Hunkin announced her candidacy for Governor of American Samoa on February 25, 2012, in front of a small group of supporters and journalists. The announcement was held in the village of Vailoa. Hunkin is the only female candidate who ran for governor in 2012. She is the first female candidate for governor since the 2000 gubernatorial election.

At the same press conference, Hunkin announced her running mate, retired United States Command Sergeant Major Iuniasolua Savusa, also known as Iuni Savusa, who served in the United States Army for thirty-six years before retiring on December 31, 2011. Hunkin contacted Savusa just four days after his retirement to ask him to be her running mate for Lieutenant Governor of American Samoa.

The 2012 gubernatorial election was held on November 6, 2012.

She is now the director of the Department of Education in American Samoa.

On June 11, 2016, Hunkin formally and officially announced her candidacy for the delegate to the United States House of Representatives from American Samoa's at-large congressional district, running as one of the two Democratic tickets, the other being Mapu Jamias.
