= American Samoa's at-large congressional district =

At-large U.S. House district for American Samoa

Coordinates: 14.3°S 170.7°W

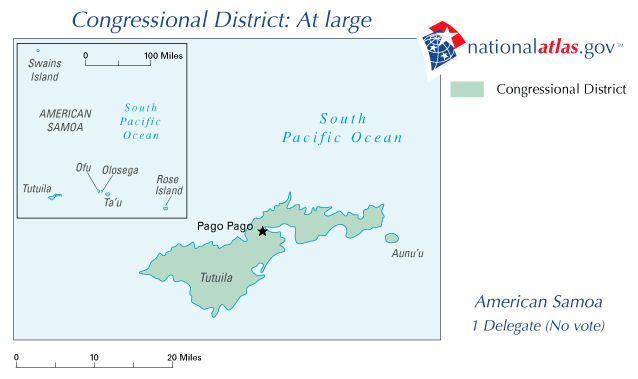
- Delegate: Amata Coleman Radewagen; R–Pago Pago
- Area: 77 mi^{2} (200 km^{2})
- Population (2020): 44,620
- Median household income: 15,851
- Ethnicity: 92.9% other; 2.9% Asian; 1.2% White; 0.2% Hispanic; 0.0% Black; 0.0% Native American

American Samoa's at-large congressional district encompasses the entire U.S. territorial region of American Samoa. The territory does not have a voting member of Congress but does elect a delegate who can participate in debates and vote in committees of which they are a member. Amata Coleman Radewagen is the current delegate of the islands.

== Delegates at-large ==
From 1970 to 1978, American Samoa elected an unofficial delegate-at-large in four-year terms to lobby for formal admission to the House of Representatives until the delegate was formally recognized by Congress.

Name	Party	Start	End
A. U. Fuimaono	Democratic	1971	1975
A. P. Lutali	Democratic	1975	1979
Fofō Sunia	Democratic	1979	1981

== List of delegates representing the district ==
Delegate	Party	Term	Cong ress	Electoral history
District established October 31, 1978
Vacant		October 31, 1978 – January 3, 1981	95th 96th	
Fofó Iosefa Fiti Sunia (Pago Pago)	Democratic	January 3, 1981 – September 6, 1988	97th 98th 99th 100th	Elected in 1980. Re-elected in 1982. Re-elected in 1984. Re-elected in 1986. Resigned.
Vacant		September 6, 1988 – January 3, 1989	100th	
Eni Faleomavaega (Vailoatai)	Democratic	January 3, 1989 – January 3, 2015	101st 102nd 103rd 104th 105th 106th 107th 108th 109th 110th 111th 112th 113th	Elected in 1988. Re-elected in 1990. Re-elected in 1992. Re-elected in 1994. Re-elected in 1996. Re-elected in 1998. Re-elected in 2000. Re-elected in 2002. Re-elected in 2004. Re-elected in 2006. Re-elected in 2008. Re-elected in 2010. Re-elected in 2012. Lost re-election.
Amata Coleman Radewagen (Pago Pago)	Republican	January 3, 2015 – present	114th 115th 116th 117th 118th 119th	Elected in 2014. Re-elected in 2016. Re-elected in 2018. Re-elected in 2020. Re-elected in 2022. Re-elected in 2024. Re-elected in 2026.

== Election results ==
=== 1980 ===
American Samoa Delegate to the United States House of Representatives election, November 4, 1980
Party	Candidate	Votes	%
Democratic	Fofó Iosefa Fiti Sunia	3,277	43.7%
Independent	Eni F. H. Faleomavaega	2,851	38.0%
Democratic	I. S Mulitauaopele	1,371	18.3%
Total votes		7,499	100.00%

=== 1982 ===
American Samoa Delegate to the United States House of Representatives election, November 2, 1982
Party	Candidate	Votes	%
Democratic	Fofó Iosefa Fiti Sunia (Incumbent)	5,397	100.0%
Total votes		5,397	100.00%

=== 1984 ===
American Samoa Delegate to the United States House of Representatives election, November 6, 1984
Party	Candidate	Votes	%
Democratic	Fofó Iosefa Fiti Sunia (Incumbent)	5,931	65.2%
Independent	Aumoeualogo Salanoa Soli	3,164	34.8%
Total votes		9,095	100.00%

=== 1986 ===
American Samoa Delegate to the United States House of Representatives election, November 4, 1986
Party	Candidate	Votes	%
Democratic	Fofó Iosefa Fiti Sunia (Incumbent)	5,073	55.5%
Republican	Aumoeualogo Salanoa Soli	4,067	44.5%
Total votes		9,140	100.00%

=== 1988 ===
American Samoa Delegate to the United States House of Representatives election, November 8, 1988
Party	Candidate	Votes	%
Democratic	Eni F. H. Faleomavaega	4,054	37.3%
Write-in	Tufele Li'amatua	3,764	34.7%
Republican	Aumoeualogo Salanoa Soli	2,125	19.6%
Democratic	I. S Mulitauaopele	912	8.4%
Total votes		10,855	100.00%

=== 1990 ===
American Samoa Delegate to the United States House of Representatives election, November 6, 1990
Party	Candidate	Votes	%
Democratic	Eni F. H. Faleomavaega (Incumbent)	6,049	54.8%
Independent	Ace A. Tago	2,567	23.3%
Democratic	Afoa Moega Lutu	1,934	17.5%
Democratic	Moaaliitele Tuufuli	481	4.4%
Total votes		11,031	100.00%

=== 1992 ===
American Samoa Delegate to the United States House of Representatives election, November 3, 1992
Party	Candidate	Votes	%
Democratic	Eni F. H. Faleomavaega (Incumbent)	7,955	64.4%
Republican	Tautai Aviata Fano Fa'alevao	2,263	18.3%
Republican	Sili Kerisiano Sataua	1,531	12.4%
Republican	Tuika Tuika	606	4.9%
Total votes		12,355	100.00%

=== 1994 ===
American Samoa Delegate to the United States House of Representatives election, November 8, 1994
Party	Candidate	Votes	%
Democratic	Eni F. H. Faleomavaega (Incumbent)	6,517	63.5%
Republican	Amata Coleman Radewagen	2,116	20.6%
Independent	Fal'ivae Apelu Galea'i	1,299	12.7%
Independent	Tuika Tuika	324	3.2%
Total votes		10,256	100.00%

=== 1996 ===
American Samoa Delegate to the United States House of Representatives election, November 5, 1996
Party	Candidate	Votes	%
Democratic	Eni F. H. Faleomavaega (Incumbent)	6,321	56.5%
Independent	Gus Hanneman	4,871	43.5%
Total votes		11,192	100.00%

=== 1998 ===
American Samoa Delegate to the United States House of Representatives election, November 3, 1998
Party	Candidate	Votes	%
Democratic	Eni F. H. Faleomavaega (Incumbent)	8,138	80.8%
Independent	Seigafolava Robert Pene	1,273	12.7%
Independent	Amata Coleman Radewagen	651	6.5%
Total votes		10,062	100.00%

=== 2000 ===
American Samoa Delegate to the United States House of Representatives election, November 7, 2000
Party	Candidate	Votes	%
Democratic	Eni F. H. Faleomavaega (Incumbent)	5,500	61.1%
Independent	Gus Hanneman	3,505	38.9%
Total votes		9,005	100.00%

=== 2002 ===
American Samoa Delegate to the United States House of Representatives election, November 5, 2002 (Runoff November 19, 2002)
Party	Candidate	Votes	%
Democratic	Eni F. H. Faleomavaega (Incumbent)	4,294	41.3%
Independent	Fagafaga D. Langkilde	3,332	32.1%
Republican	Amata Coleman Radewagen	2,767	26.6%
Total votes		10,393	100.00%
General election
Democratic	Eni F. H. Faleomavaega (Incumbent)	4,959	54.8%
Independent	Fagafaga D. Langkilde	4,083	45.2%
Total votes		9,042	100.00%

=== 2004 ===
American Samoa Delegate to the United States House of Representatives election, November 2, 2004
Party	Candidate	Votes	%
Democratic	Eni F. H. Faleomavaega (Incumbent)	6,656	54.9%
Republican	Amata Coleman Radewagen	5,472	45.1%
Total votes		12,128	100.00%

=== 2006 ===
American Samoa Delegate to the United States House of Representatives election, November 7, 2006
Party	Candidate	Votes	%
Democratic	Eni F. H. Faleomavaega (Incumbent)	5,195	47.1%
Republican	Amata Coleman Radewagen	4,493	40.7%
Independent	Ae Ae Muavaefaatasi, Jr.	1,345	12.2%
Total votes		11,033	100.00%

=== 2008 ===
American Samoa Delegate to the United States House of Representatives election, November 4, 2008
Party	Candidate	Votes	%
Democratic	Eni F. H. Faleomavaega (Incumbent)	7,499	60.4%
Republican	Amata Coleman Radewagen	4,350	35.0%
Independent	Rosie Fuala'au Tago Lancaster	570	4.6%
Total votes		12,419	100.00%

=== 2010 ===
American Samoa Delegate to the United States House of Representatives election, November 2, 2010
Party	Candidate	Votes	%
Democratic	Eni F. H. Faleomavaega (Incumbent)	6,182	56.4%
Republican	Amata Coleman Radewagen	4,422	40.3%
Independent	Tuika Tuika	356	3.3%
Total votes		10,960	100.00%

=== 2012 ===
Election results, American Samoa's At-large Congressional District, November 6, 2012
Party	Candidate	Votes	%
Democratic	Eni F.H. Faleomavaega (incumbent)	7,221	55.22
Constitution	Amata Coleman Radewagen	4,420	33.80
Independent	Rosie F. Tago Lancaster	697	5.33
Democratic	Kereti Mata'utia Jr.	438	3.35
Independent	Fatumalala Leulua’iali’i A. Al-Sheri	300	2.29
Total votes		13,076	100
Democratic hold			

=== 2014 ===
Election results, American Samoa's At-large Congressional District, November 4, 2014
Party	Candidate	Votes	%
Republican	Amata Coleman Radewagen	4,306	42.00
Democratic	Eni F.H. Faleomavaega (incumbent)	3,157	30.80
Democratic	Togiola Tulafono	1,130	11.00
Democratic	Mapu S. Jamias	652	6.40
Independent	Rosie Fuala'au Tago Lancaster	268	2.60
Democratic	Meleagi Suitonu-Chapman	229	2.20
Independent	Tuika Tuika	201	2.00
Democratic	Tu'au Kereti Mata'Utia Jr	160	1.60
Democratic	Mark Ude	143	1.40
Total votes		10,246	100.00
Republican gain from Democratic			

=== 2016 ===
American Samoa Delegate to the United States House of Representatives election, November 8, 2016
Party	Candidate	Votes	%
Republican	Amata Coleman Radewagen (inc.)	8,924	75.4
Democratic	Salu Hunkin-Finau	1,581	13.4
Democratic	Mapu Jamias	978	8.3
Democratic	Meleagi Suitonu-Chapman	181	1.50
Independent	Timothy Jones	171	1.40
Total votes		11,835	100
Republican hold			

=== 2018 ===
American Samoa Delegate election results, 2018
Party	Candidate	Votes	%
Republican	Amata Coleman Radewagen (inc.)	7,194	83.28%
Independent	Tuika Tuika	785	9.09%
Democratic	Meleagi Suitonu-Chapman	659	7.63%
Total votes		8,638	100%
Republican hold			

=== 2020 ===
American Samoa Delegate election results, 2020
Party	Candidate	Votes	%
Republican	Amata Coleman Radewagen (inc.)	9,880	83.5%
Democratic	Oreta Crichton	1,704	14.4%
Democratic	Meleagi Suitonu-Chapman	249	2.1%
Total votes		11,833	100%
Republican hold			

=== 2022 ===
American Samoa Delegate election results, 2022
Party	Candidate	Votes	%
Republican	Amata Coleman Radewagen (inc.)	6,637	100
Total votes		6,637	100
Republican hold			

=== 2024 ===
American Samoa Delegate election results, 2024
Party	Candidate	Votes	%
Republican	Amata Coleman Radewagen (inc.)	7,394	74.78%
Democratic	Luisa Kuaea	1,840	18.61%
Independent	Fualaau Tago Lancaster	469	4.74%
Democratic	Meleagi Suitonu-Chapman	185	1.87%
Total votes		9,888	100%
Republican hold			
