= Gaioi Tufele Galeai =

American politician

5th Lieutenant Governor of American Samoa Acting
- In office August 1992 – January 3, 1993
- Governor: Peter Tali Coleman
- Preceded by: Galea'i Peni Poumele
- Succeeded by: Tauese Sunia

Personal details
- Party: Republican
- Spouse: Galea'i Peni Poumele (m. 1946; died 1992)

Gaioi Tufele Galeai served as the interim lieutenant governor of American Samoa from 1992 until 1993. She was appointed by Governor Peter Tali Coleman to fill the remainder of the term of her husband, Galea'i Peni Poumele, who had died in office. She was a member of the Republican Party of American Samoa.

Gaioi is the daughter of High Chief Tufele. She married Galea'i Peni Poumele on July 20, 1946, in Faga'alu, American Samoa. They had a total of seven biological children, three adopted children, 26 grandchildren, and three great-grandchildren.
