= Lualemaga Faoliu =

American politician

Member of the Senate
- In office –1975
- Succeeded by: A. U. Fuimaono
- Constituency: 9th District

Personal details
- Born: 24 May 1931 American Samoa
- Died: 19 December 1975 (aged 44) Satuiatua, Western Samoa

Lualemaga Faoliu (24 May 1931 – 19 December 1975) was an American Samoan chief and politician who served as a member of the Senate.

== Biography ==
Faoliu was born and educated in American Samoa, where he was originally from A'oloau. He variously worked as a schoolteacher, radio operator, air traffic controller and communications weather observer before he succeeded his father as chief in 1960. He was subsequently elected to the Senate representing the 9th district. He resided in Honolulu in Hawaii in later years, and was one of the founders of Hawaii's Samoan Council of Chiefs and Orators and chairman of Honolulu's Samoa Day celebrations.

In 1975 he commissioned the building of the largest meeting house in American Samoa. Upon completion, the head carpenter from Western Samoa died. Faoliu accompanied the body back to Western Samoa. While staying overnight in Satuiatua, he was shot in the stomach as he slept following a dispute over etiquette at an 'ava ceremony, later dying in hospital.

His body was returned to American Samoa where thousands greeted the plane as it arrived. Cardinal Pio Taofinuʻu accompanied the body home due to concerns about reprisals for the murder. After a brief ceremony at the Senate, he was buried in A'oloau.
