= Galea'i Peni Poumele =

American politician

4th Lieutenant Governor of American Samoa
- In office January 2, 1989 – July 27, 1992
- Governor: Peter Tali Coleman
- Preceded by: Eni Faleomavaega
- Succeeded by: Gaioi Tufele Galeai

President of the American Samoa Senate
- In office 1979–1985

Personal details
- Born: December 18, 1926 Fitiuta, Manu'a, American Samoa
- Died: July 27, 1992 (aged 65)
- Party: Republican
- Spouse: Gaioi Tufele Galea'i (m. 1946)
- Children: Poumele A.P. Galea'i

Galea'i Peni Poumele (December 18, 1926 – July 27, 1992) was a Republican American Samoan politician and traditional leader. Poumele served as the fourth lieutenant governor of American Samoa from 1989 to 1992.

He was the first Chairman of the Congregational Christian Church of American Samoa and instrumental in its establishment in the 1980s.

== Biography ==
=== Personal life ===
Poumele was a paramount chief of the village of Fitiuta, where he was born, located on Tau in the Manu'a Islands. After graduating from Papatea, Poumele joined the Fitafita Guard in 1943, the United States Navy in 1950, where he served there for thirty years. He moved with his family back to American Samoa in 1967 in order to work with the Office of the Attorney General. He was later appointed Director of Civil Defense for American Samoa. From 1971 to 1979, he served as the director of personnel at StarKist. The title "Galea'i" was bestowed upon him in Fitiuta on September 26, 1972. The chiefly title of Galea'i became vacant upon Poumele's death in 1992. He is buried in Nuʻuuli.

=== Political career ===
Poumele served one term in the American Samoa House of Representatives representing Itu'au County in the 12th Legislature. In 1972, Ta'u, Fitiuta and Faleasao elected Poumele to the American Samoa Senate, where he was re-appointed for five consecutive terms. He was the President of the American Samoa Senate for six years. In 1985, he was also appointed to Secretary of Samoan Affairs by Governor A. P. Lutali.

In 1988, Peter Tali Coleman and his running mate, Galea'i Peni Poumele, were elected Governor and Lt. Governor of American Samoa. Coleman and Poumele were inaugurated on January 2, 1989. Poumele became the third elected Lieutenant Governor of American Samoa, while the 1989 inauguration marked Coleman's fourth nonconsecutive term as governor.

Lieutenant Governor Galea'i Peni Poumele died in office on July 27, 1992, at the age of 65. His term was then finished his wife, Gaioioi Tufele Galea'i. He was succeeded by Tauese Sunia, who was inaugurated Lt. Governor on January 4, 1993, with incoming Governor A. P. Lutali.

Political offices
| Preceded by Eni Faleomavaega | Lieutenant Governor of American Samoa; 1989–1992 | Succeeded by Gaioi Tufele Galeai |
