= Sandra King-Young =

American Samoan Medicaid Director

- King-Young in 2015

Personal details
- Born: Samoa
- Party: Democratic
- Education: Loyola Marymount University (BA); George Washington University (JD)
- Website: Campaign website

Tofoitaufa Sandra Salevasaosamoa King-Young is an American Samoan politician and public servant. She is a former Director of the American Samoa Medicaid State Agency and has worked in the United States federal government and in American Samoa. She is the official Democratic National Committee of American Samoa-endorsed candidate for Delegate to the United States House of Representatives from American Samoa in the 2026 election.

== Early life and education ==
King-Young was educated at Loyola Marymount University, George Washington University Law School, and the Stanford Graduate School of Business.

== Career ==
King-Young worked in Washington, D.C., including as a staff member of the United States Senate Rules Committee. In 1999, she was appointed Deputy Director of the Office of Insular Affairs in the United States Department of the Interior.

She later returned to American Samoa and founded the Pacific Islands Center for Educational Development (PiCED), an organization focused on educational opportunities and leadership development.

In July 2026, King-Young was recognized as one of the honorees at Radio International Samoa's 40th Anniversary Gala held in Honolulu, Hawaii, alongside legendary Samoan musical artist Jerome Grey and other prominent Pacific Island leaders.

=== American Samoa Medicaid ===
In August 2013, King-Young resigned as chair of the LBJ Tropical Medical Center in order to become Director of the American Samoa Medicaid State Agency.

As Medicaid Director, King-Young became a prominent participant in discussions concerning federal Medicaid funding for American Samoa. In 2017, she was involved in congressional discussions concerning healthcare services at LBJ Tropical Medical Center.

In May 2019, King-Young appeared before the United States House Committee on Natural Resources during a hearing concerning the Medicaid funding situation in the U.S. territories. Her testimony addressed the impact of federal Medicaid funding limitations on American Samoa's healthcare system.

In 2020, King-Young proposed that revenue from a sales tax or the legalization of medical marijuana could be used to help fund Medicaid in American Samoa.

== Political career ==
King-Young participated in the 2012 American Samoa gubernatorial election as the running mate of Save Liuato Tuitele. The Tuitele–King-Young ticket was eliminated in the first round of voting.

== 2026 congressional campaign ==
In February 2026, King-Young formally announced her candidacy for Delegate to the United States House of Representatives from American Samoa in the November 3, 2026 election. In her announcement, she identified healthcare, education, veterans' healthcare, economic development, and the regulation of deep-sea mining among the issues motivating her campaign.

In May 2026, the Federal Election Commission registered the Committee to Elect Sandra King Young for Congress as a federal campaign committee. The committee's registration date was May 20, 2026, and its committee identification number is C00951251.

In June 2026, both Samoa News and Talanei reported on the formal registration of King-Young's congressional campaign committee with the Federal Election Commission.

The American Samoa Election Office subsequently certified King-Young as one of six candidates for Delegate to the United States Congress in the November 3, 2026 election.
