= 1996 American Samoan general election =

General elections were held in American Samoa on 5 November 1996, to elect a new governor and lieutenant governor, twenty members of the American Samoa House of Representatives and the Delegate to United States House of Representatives.

== Results ==
=== Governor ===
Candidate	Running mate	Votes	%
Tauese Sunia	Togiola Tulafono	4,404	39.74
Leala	Afoa	4,318	38.96
Lutali	Moaliitele	1,377	12.43
Tufele	Fagafaga	941	8.49
Tuika	Mapu	42	0.38
Total		11,082	100.00

=== House of Representatives ===
District	Candidate	Votes	%
1 – Manuʻa	Puaopea F. Paopao	327	26.35
1 – Manuʻa	Mailo Sao T. Nua	294	23.69
1 – Manuʻa	Fetu Fetui Jr.	274	22.08
1 – Manuʻa	Faletui S. Lua Moliga	216	17.41
1 – Manuʻa	Manusamoa M. Fiame	130	10.48
2 – Manuʻa	Toeaina Faufano Autele	202	50.12
2 – Manuʻa	Savali Vaeao	201	49.88
3 – Vaifanua	Lavea Seaaliitu F. Mauga	312	44.76
3 – Vaifanua	Meloma F. Afuola	242	34.72
3 – Vaifanua	Elisara Tiamo Togiai	143	20.52
4 – Saole	Agaoleatu Charlie Tautolo	275	50.46
4 – Saole	Fainuulelei L. F. Alailima Utu	270	49.54
5 – Sua #1	Alamoana S. Mulitauaopele	200	42.11
5 – Sua #1	Ierusalema V. Sauni	102	21.47
5 – Sua #1	Vitale Liutoa Vili	96	20.21
5 – Sua #1	Tumua L. Mulitauaopele	77	16.21
6 – Sua #2	Manila Launiu	180	47.62
6 – Sua #2	Uitualagi Falelaulii Sua Gaoteote	104	27.51
6 – Sua #2	Letumu F. Talauega	94	24.87
7 – Maoputasi #1	Sua C. Schuster	303	48.95
7 – Maoputasi #1	Betty Pene Ah-Soon	159	25.69
7 – Maoputasi #1	Patea Luuga Fuimaono	82	13.25
7 – Maoputasi #1	Peseta Fiaaoga Siatuu	75	12.12
8 – Maoputasi #2	Matagi R. Mailo McMoore	317	55.61
8 – Maoputasi #2	Taesalialii (Suka) Lutu	253	44.39
9 – Maoputasi #3	Ae Ae Jr.	499	56.51
9 – Maoputasi #3	Fiasili Puni E. Haleck	384	43.49
10 – Maoputasi #4	Malualii Liusa A. Young	189	58.70
10 – Maoputasi #4	Tigilau Savea Tiula Nua	133	41.30
11 – Maoputasi #5	Fagamalama S. Fualaau	245	48.42
11 – Maoputasi #5	Saofaigaolii Maulupe	134	26.48
11 – Maoputasi #5	Finagalouatasi S. Maafala	127	25.10
12 – Ituau	Malaetasi Mauga Togafau	799	34.45
12 – Ituau	Fagasoaia F. Lealaitafea	613	26.43
12 – Ituau	Ativalu Tago Jr.	585	25.23
12 – Ituau	Tofu T. Fia	322	13.89
13 – Fofo	Avegalio P. Aigamaua	476	64.50
13 – Fofo	Puaina Malua Tuitele	262	35.50
14 – Lealataua	Savali Talavou Ale	247	52.67
14 – Lealataua	Auelua Faataumalama Feleti	222	47.33
15 – Tualauta	Tula Fagaima Solaita Jr.	1,142	39.16
15 – Tualauta	Solomona T. Mailo	750	25.72
15 – Tualauta	Ufuti Faafetai Ieremia	720	24.69
15 – Tualauta	John Roberts	304	10.43
16 – Tualatai	Seti Tasi Lopa	331	53.65
16 – Tualatai	Tuiasina Tuumai Laumoli	286	46.35
17 – Leasina	Va Moananu	147	38.68
17 – Leasina	Paulo Fiatala Afalava	120	31.58
17 – Leasina	Vaitagaloa N. Tuiolemotu	113	29.74

=== Delegate ===
Candidate	Party	Votes	%
Eni F. H. Faleomavaega	Democratic Party	6,321	56.48
Gus Hanneman	Independent	4,871	43.52
Total		11,192	100.00
