= Fofō Iosefa Fiti Sunia =

American Samoan politician (1937–2025)

Iosefa Sunia
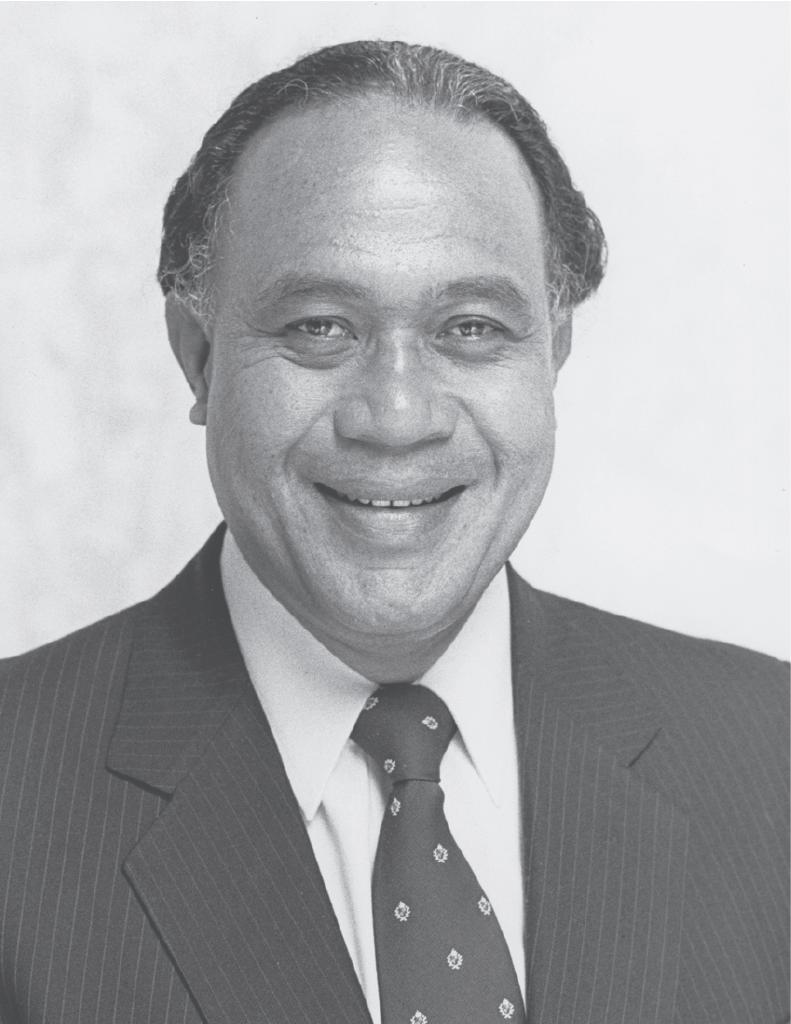

Delegate to the U.S. House of Representatives from American Samoa's at-large district
- In office January 3, 1981 – September 6, 1988
- Preceded by: Himself (Delegate at-large)
- Succeeded by: Eni Faleomavaega

Delegate at-large of American Samoa
- In office January 3, 1979 – January 3, 1981
- Preceded by: A. P. Lutali
- Succeeded by: Himself (Delegate)

Personal details
- Born: Iosefa Fiti Sunia; March 13, 1937 Fagasā, American Samoa
- Died: October 14, 2025 (aged 88) Fagaʻalu, American Samoa
- Party: Democratic
- Spouse: Aioletuna Ta’amū
- Children: 8
- Education: University of Hawaii, Manoa (BA)

Fofō Iosefa Fiti Sunia (March 13, 1937 – October 14, 2025) was an American Samoan politician. He was the first non-voting Delegate from American Samoa to the United States House of Representatives.

== Early life and career ==
Fofō Iosefa Fiti Sunia was born in Fagasā on March 13, 1937. He attended the University of Hawaiʻi and earned a bachelor's degree in economics. Sunia was the administrative officer for the Samoan affairs-liaison functions for the Governor of American Samoa, and served as a translator and interpreter and an election commissioner from 1961 to 1966. He founded the Samoan News newspaper in 1964 and became director of tourism for the Government of American Samoa in 1966, serving until 1970. Sunia was elected a territorial Senator in 1970 and was a member of the legislature until 1978. He also formerly served as president and chairman of the American Samoan Development Corporation.

== Congress ==
Sunia was elected to Congress in 1980. He served from January 3, 1981, until his resignation on September 6, 1988, after he was indicted on federal charges of running a payroll padding scheme. He pleaded guilty and was sentenced to five to fifteen months in prison and to pay $65,000 in restitution.

=== Political views ===
As a Delegate to the U.S. Congress, Sunia opposed a Constitutional amendment which would have made English the official language of the United States. He argued that English already is the language of the U.S. and the law represented few if any changes to the status quo. He was quoted as saying: "… the 35,000 American Samoans on the island use the Samoan language in government, in the court, in business and in all facets of daily living, but strive to improve their proficiency in English." He did not believe the proposed amendment would reward "linguistic differences as an asset."

== After Congress ==
Sunia was released from prison after 11 months. His knowledge and experience outweighed his conviction and he was hired to work as a staff member for the American Samoa Fono. By 1993, he was the highest-ranking staffer.

Sunia died on October 14, 2025, at the age of 88.

== See also ==
- List of Asian Americans and Pacific Islands Americans in the United States Congress

U.S. House of Representatives
Preceded by A. P. Lutali	Delegate at-large of American Samoa; 1979–1981	Succeeded by Himself as U.S. Delegate
Preceded by Himself as Delegate at-large of American Samoa	Delegate to the U.S. House of Representatives from American Samoa's at-large congressional district 1981–1988	Succeeded by Eni Faleomavaega
