= Peter Tali Coleman =

American Samoa politician (1919–1997)

Peter Coleman
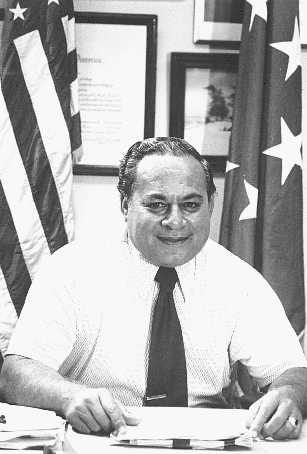

1st & 3rd Governor of American Samoa
- In office January 2, 1989 – January 3, 1993
- Lieutenant: Galea'i Poumele; Gaioi Galeai
- Preceded by: A. P. Lutali
- Succeeded by: A. P. Lutali
- In office January 3, 1978 – January 3, 1985
- Lieutenant: Tufele Liamatua
- Preceded by: Rex Lee
- Succeeded by: A. P. Lutali

Appointed Governor of American Samoa
- In office October 15, 1956 – May 24, 1961
- Preceded by: Richard Lowe
- Succeeded by: Rex Lee

High Commissioner of the Trust Territory of the Pacific Islands Acting
- In office July 1, 1976 – July 9, 1977
- Preceded by: Edward E. Johnston
- Succeeded by: Adrian P. Winkel

1st Attorney General of American Samoa
- In office June 1955 – October 15, 1956
- Governor: Richard Lowe
- Preceded by: Position established
- Succeeded by: Owen Aspinall

Personal details
- Born: December 8, 1919 Pago Pago, American Samoa, U.S.
- Died: April 28, 1997 (aged 77) Honolulu, Hawaii, U.S.
- Party: Republican
- Spouse: Nora Stewart (m. 1941)
- Children: 13, including Amata
- Education: Georgetown University (BA, LLB)

Military service
- Allegiance: United States
- Branch/service: United States Army
- Rank: Captain
- Battles/wars: World War II

Peter Tali Coleman (December 8, 1919 – April 28, 1997) was an American Samoan politician and lawyer. Coleman was the first and only person of Samoan descent to be appointed governor of American Samoa between 1956 and 1961 and later became the territory's first and third popularly elected governor from 1978 to 1985 and 1989 to 1993, serving a total of three elected terms. In between, he had served in different administrative positions for Pacific islands.

Born to an American navy officer and a native mother in American Samoa, he grew up there and in Hawaii and participated in World War II, before becoming a lawyer and then returning to American Samoa to practice law there. In 1955 he was briefly appointed by the Republican federal government as the first native-born Attorney General of American Samoa and then became governor in 1956. During his first administration, Coleman chaired the convention that drafted the Constitution of American Samoa, containing the bill of rights and providing protection for Samoans against alienation of their lands and loss of their culture. His administration also laid the foundation for the American Samoa Fono legislature and produced the official seal and flag of American Samoa. When the Democrats overtook the federal government, he was replaced and appointed to different administrative positions for Pacific islands.

He came back to American Samoa once more in 1977 to run for the first gubernatorial election of the territory. After American Samoans had finally approved electing their own governor in that year, he was elected the first and third governor in 1977, 1980, and 1988 over his Democratic rival A. P. Lutali each time, losing against him in 1992. He also was the founding chairman of the territory's Republican Party, serving from 1985 to 1988. He was the first Republican governor in American Samoa and one of only two Republicans to hold the office, with the other being Pula Nikolao Pula who is the ninth and current governor as of May 2025.

Coleman's career spanned over the entire second half of the 20th century. He is the only governor in the United States whose service spanned five decades and one of the longest-serving governors of any jurisdiction in American history. He was a recipient of the 1997 American Samoan Governor's Humanitarian Award and gained the chiefly title Uifa’atali from his home village of Pago Pago. The Peter Tali Coleman Lecture on Pacific Public Policy has been a part of the Pacific Islands Project at Georgetown University, where Coleman received his degree. In 1978, he received an Honorary Doctorate from Chaminade University of Honolulu and in 1970 one from the University of Guam.

== Background ==
=== Early life and career ===
Born and raised in Pago Pago, American Samoa, Coleman attended the faifeau and Marist schools, before graduating from Saint Louis School in Honolulu, Hawaii. His parents were Navyman Patrick Dyke Coleman from Washington, DC, and Amata Auma from the Uifaatali family. His family title, Uifaatali, was bestowed on him in 1977. Coleman later joined the U.S. Army, rising to the rank of captain during World War II. He returned to the Samoan Islands in the early 1950s and practiced law in Pago Pago and in Apia. He received his law degree from Georgetown University in 1951 and was the first person of Samoan ancestry to receive a law degree from an American university or from any university. He served in American Samoa both as a public defender and as the territory's attorney general.

Coleman was appointed governor of American Samoa in 1956 by President Dwight Eisenhower. At the conclusion of his term, he served a variety of positions in the Pacific Islands, including district administrator for the Marshall Islands, district administrator for the Marianas Islands, and deputy high commissioner of the Trust Territory of the Pacific Islands, where he also served as acting high commissioner for one year.

When the Republican Party lost the White House in 1960, Coleman was assigned as deputy high commissioner of the U.S. Trust Territories. He served 17 years in that post, returning in 1977 to run in the first gubernatorial election. Coleman was the first Samoan to become Governor in 1956 and the only one who served by appointment. In 1977, he also became the first elected Governor in American Samoa. He was reelected in 1980, lost the 1984 election, and was reelected once again in 1988.

Coleman became the first popularly elected Samoan governor after defeating Democrat A. P. Lutali with 60% of the votes in a special runoff election held on November 22, 1977. The election was described by The New York Times as “a major step toward self-determination by island’s residents.” After having turned down the proposal to elect their own Governor in three plebiscites, American Samoans in 1977 had also overwhelmingly approved the measure which allowed them to elect that official.

=== Death and legacy ===
Peter Coleman and Nora Stewart of Honolulu were married in 1941. They had thirteen children, twenty-three grandchildren, and eight great-grandchildren. In 2014, his daughter Aumua Amata Radewagen was elected Delegate to represent American Samoa in the United States House of Representatives. She is the first woman to represent American Samoa in Congress.

Coleman died in 1997 in Honolulu after a two-year struggle with liver cancer.

Coleman's legacy includes the effort to incorporate American Samoa in the Social Security system and the recognition and promotion of tourism as an economic development strategy. He began to rebuild and expand the Tafuna Airstrip to take jet planes. The policy for local autonomy moved further during his years as Governor.

At the conclusion of Coleman's three-year term, Coleman cited some of the achievements that made him proud. These included changes to the judiciary system with the addition of the district and village courts, the start of the Teacher Corps program, the addition of renal dialysis at LBJ Hospital, and the completion of the Aua-Top Mle and Aoa-Amouli roads.

Coleman was responsible for the territory's membership in the National Governors Association (NGA) and the Regional Western Governors Association.

== Political resume ==
Coleman's political career included:

- 1940-45: U.S. Army infantry servicing in the Solomon Islands, Vanuatu, and Hawai'i
- 1946-47: Staff Secretary for Senator George H. Bender
- 1951: Received a law degree from Georgetown University, where he was a John Hay Whitney Foundation fellow
- 1951-52: Pacific area analyst at the Interior Department in Washington, DC
- 1952-55: Public Defender of American Samoa
- 1955-56: Attorney General of American Samoa
- 1956: Appointed Governor of American Samoa
- 1961: Appointed district administrator of the Marshall Islands
- 1965: Named district administrator of the Mariana Islands
- 1969: Named deputy high commissioner of the U.S. Trust Territory of the Pacific Islands
- 1977: Became first elected Governor of American Samoa
- 1980: Elected to a second term as Governor
- 1980: Co-founded the Pacific Basin Development Council
- 1979: Inducted into the U.S. Army Officers' Candidate School Hall of Fame in Fort Benning, GA
- 1985: Honorary Consul for the Republic of Nauru
- 1985-88: Co-founding chairman of the Republican Party of American Samoa
- 1988: Member of the U.S. delegation to the centenary observance of the U.S.-Tonga Treaty of Friendship
- 1988: Served as a counsel to the Pacific Advisory Committee of George Bush's Fund for America's Future
- 1989: Elected to a third term as Governor
- 1992: Chairman of American Samoa's Bush-Quayle 1992 committee
- 1992: Honorary national chair of Asian Americans for Bush-Quayle '92
- 1992-93: Chairman of the Offshore Governor's Forum

Legal offices
New office	Attorney General of American Samoa; 1955–1956	Succeeded by Owen Aspinall
Political offices
Preceded by Richard Lowe	Governor of American Samoa; 1956–1961	Succeeded by Rex Lee
Preceded by Edward E. Johnston	High Commissioner of the Trust Territory of the Pacific Islands; Acting; 1976–1977	Succeeded by Adrian P. Winkel
Preceded by Rex Lee	Governor of American Samoa; 1978–1985	Succeeded by A. P. Lutali
Preceded by A. P. Lutali	Governor of American Samoa; 1989–1993	Succeeded by A. P. Lutali
Party political offices
First	Republican nominee for Governor of American Samoa; 1977, 1980	Succeeded by Tufele Liamatua
Preceded by Tufele Liamatua	Republican nominee for Governor of American Samoa; 1988, 1992	Succeeded by Peter Reid
