= Eni Faleomavaega =

American Samoan politician (1943–2017)

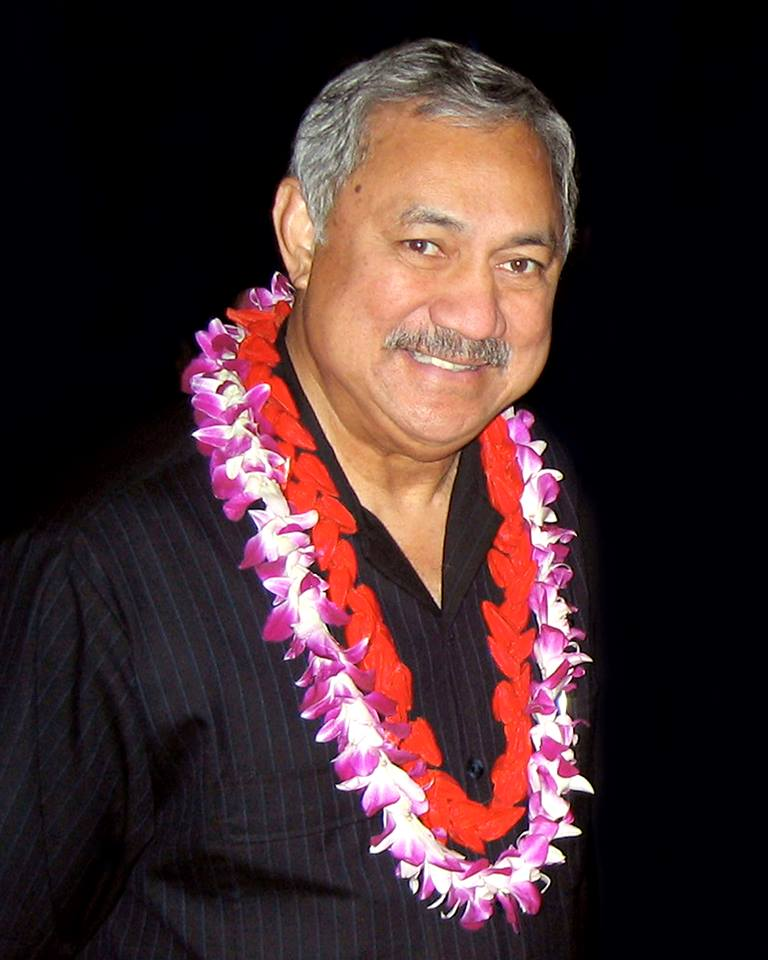

Delegate to the U.S. House of Representatives from American Samoa's at-large district
- In office January 3, 1989 – January 3, 2015
- Preceded by: Fofó Sunia
- Succeeded by: Amata Coleman Radewagen

3rd Lieutenant Governor of American Samoa
- In office January 3, 1985 – January 2, 1989
- Governor: A. P. Lutali
- Preceded by: Tufele Liamatua
- Succeeded by: Galea'i Peni Poumele

Personal details
- Born: Eni Fa'aua'a Hunkin Faleomavaega Jr. August 15, 1943 Vailoatai, American Samoa
- Died: February 22, 2017 (aged 73) Provo, Utah, U.S.
- Party: Democratic
- Spouse: Hinanui Bambridge Cave
- Children: 5
- Education: BYU–Hawaii(AA); BYU(BA); University of Houston(JD); UC Berkeley(LLM)

Military service
- Allegiance: United States
- Branch: United States Army; Army Reserve
- Years of service: 1966–1969 (Active); 1982–1990 (Reserve)
- Rank: Captain
- Unit: 100th Battalion, 442nd Infantry Regiment
- Conflict: Vietnam War
- Awards: Commendation Medal
- Eni Faleomavaega's voice Faleomavaega speaks on the United States–Hong Kong Policy Act. Recorded August 11, 1992.

Eni Fa'aua'a Hunkin Faleomavaega Jr. (/ˈɛniː fəˌleɪoʊˌmɑːvəˈɛŋɡə/ EH-nee fə-LAY-oh-MAH-və-ENG-gə; August 15, 1943 – February 22, 2017) was an American Samoan politician and attorney who served as the territory's third lieutenant governor from 1985 to 1989 and non-voting delegate to the United States House of Representatives from 1989 to 2015. As a delegate, Faleomavaega served in committees and spoke on the House floor; however, he was not permitted to vote on the final passage of any legislation. He was the father-in-law of former professional American football fullback Fui Vakapuna.

Throughout his career, Faleomavaega was an advocate for greater autonomy and self-determination for American Samoa. He worked towards achieving a status of free association with the United States, similar to the relationship between the Cook Islands and New Zealand, to address what he referred to as "colonial abuse" in the territory. Additionally, he sought to diversify American Samoa's economy to reduce its dependency on federal support. One of his legislative achievements included securing $4 million annually for scholarships enabling American Samoan students to attend colleges and universities in the United States.

== Personal life ==
Eni Faleomavaega's parents were Eni and Taualai Faaua’ā Hunkin. His father served as a member of the Fitafita Guard and later as a communications specialist for the U.S. Navy, a role that led the family to reside on Swains Island. Faleomavaega spent his early years on the islands of Tutuila and Swains. Following the U.S. Navy's withdrawal from American Samoa in 1951, the family relocated to Lāʻie, Hawaii.

In 1995, he authored Navigating the Future: A Samoan Perspective in U.S.-Pacific Relations, a book examining American Samoa’s political and social framework. In 1987, he participated in a significant cultural journey aboard the Hokule’a, a Polynesian voyaging canoe, sailing from Tahiti to Hawai’i.

The title "Faleomavaega" was conferred upon him by his Faiivae family in Leone. He married Hinanui Bambridge Cave of Papeete, French Polynesia, and they had five children.

== Early life, education, and military service ==
Faleomavaega was born in Vailoatai, American Samoa and grew up in Oahu, Hawaii. He graduated from Kahuku High School and initially attended Church College of Hawaii (now Brigham Young University–Hawaii), where he completed his associate's degree. He then transferred to Brigham Young University's main campus in Utah and earned a B.A. in political science and history in 1966. He received his J.D. from the University of Houston Law Center in 1972 and LL.M. from the UC Berkeley School of Law in 1973.

He served as an enlistee in the United States Army from 1966 to 1969, and as an officer in the United States Army Reserve from 1982 to 1989. He completed a tour in the Vietnam War and left the military with the rank of captain following his second term of service. He and his wife were active members of the Church of Jesus Christ of Latter-day Saints.

== Legal career ==
Faleomavaega served as the administrative assistant to American Samoa Delegate A. U. Fuimaono from 1973 to 1975 and as staff counsel for the House Committee on Interior and Insular Affairs from 1975 to 1981. He served as the Deputy Attorney General of American Samoa from 1981 to 1984.

== Political career ==
Faleomavaega was a candidate in the inaugural election for American Samoa’s Delegate to the U.S. Congress in 1978. He ran alongside A. P. Lutali in the 1985 gubernatorial race, and served as Lieutenant Governor of American Samoa from 1985 to 1989. In 1987, he participated in an event that followed traditional Polynesian life experiences by sailing from Tahiti to Hawaii in a canoe. In 1988, he was elected as the Delegate to the U.S. Congress, a position he held through subsequent elections.

=== Congressional delegate ===
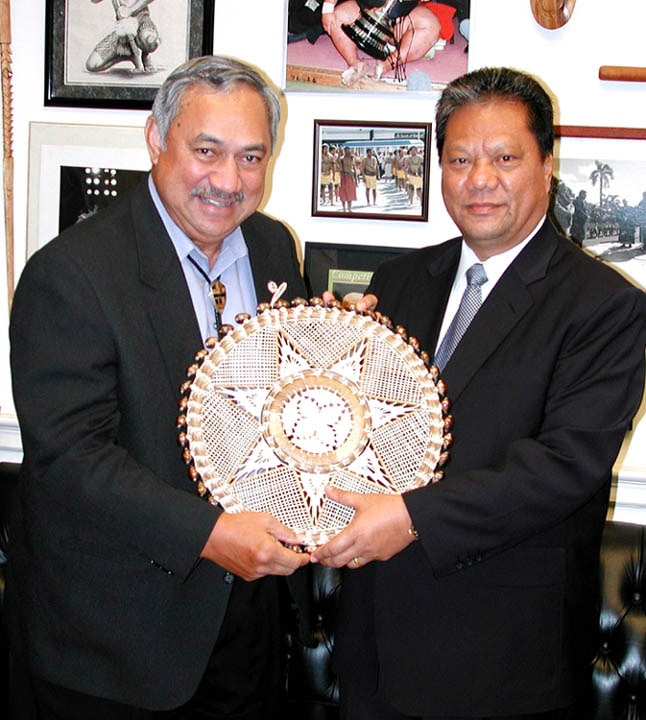
Faleomavaega and former president of the Marshall Islands Kessai Note

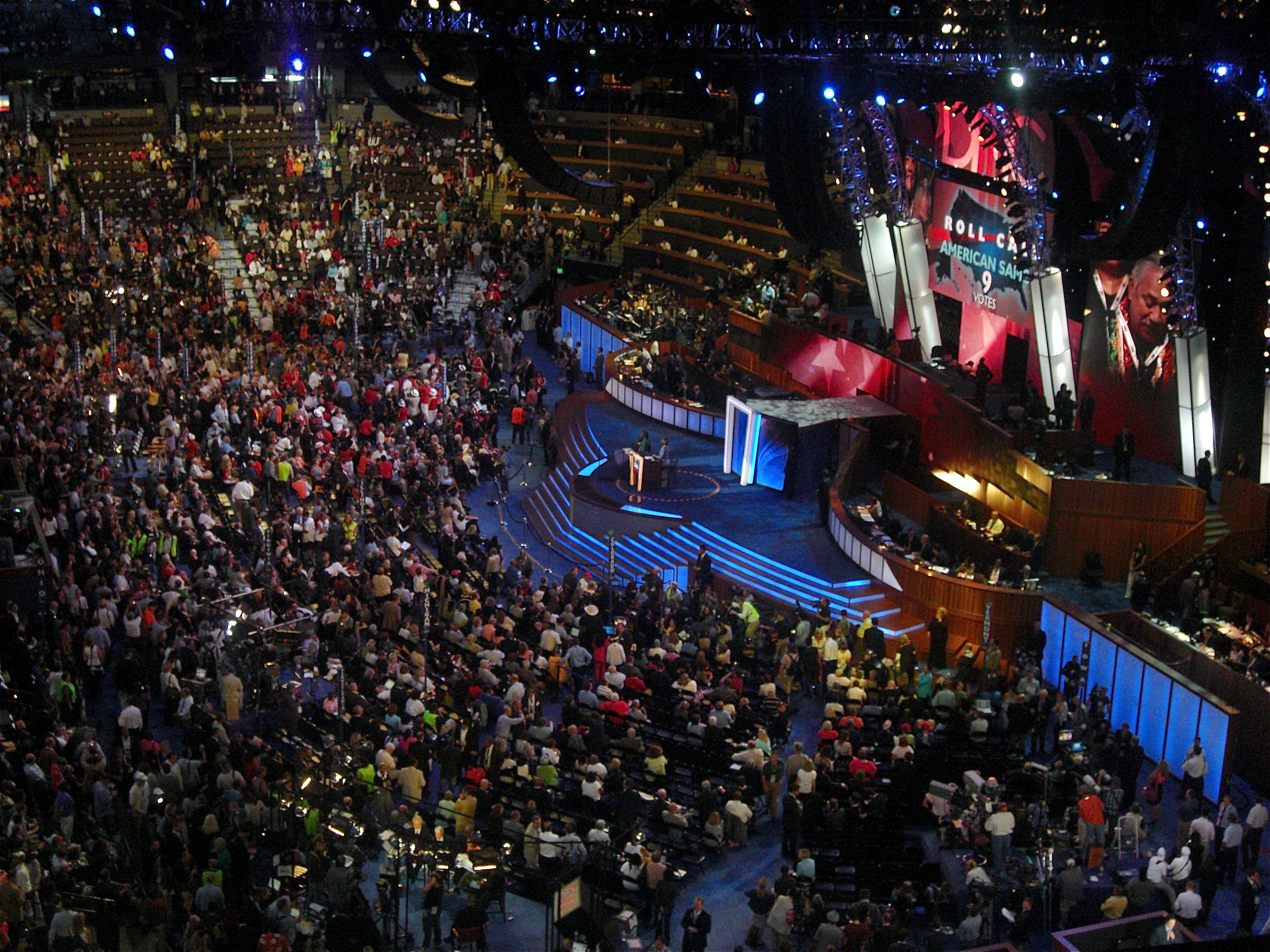
Faleomavaega, a superdelegate, announces the distribution of American Samoa's delegate votes as part of the roll call of the states during the third day of the 2008 Democratic National Convention in Denver, Colorado.

Faleomavaega was elected as a Democrat to the House of Representatives in 1988, serving from January 3, 1989 until January 2015. As a delegate, he worked to receive more federal funding for his home territory, particularly for health care and other essential services. He opposed free trade deals involving meats and seafood, as nearly one-third of American Samoa's population is involved in the tuna industry. He proposed legislation that would allow residents of US territories to vote in presidential elections if they are active duty members of the military. Faleomavaega also participated in a boycott of French president Jacques Chirac, who made a speech to a joint session of the U.S. Congress in 1996, due to French nuclear testing in the Pacific.

=== Committee assignments ===
Faleomavaega was a member of the following committees in the House of Representatives:

- Committee on Foreign Affairs
  - Subcommittee on Asia, the Pacific, and the Global Environment (Ranking Member)
  - Subcommittee on the Western Hemisphere
- Committee on Natural Resources
  - Subcommittee on Energy and Mineral Resources
  - Subcommittee on Fisheries, Wildlife, Oceans and Insular Affairs

=== Caucuses ===
- Congressional Asian Pacific American Caucus

=== Support for the Sri Lankan civil war ===
Faleomavaega has said that it is more opportune if the United States could refrain from interfering in the internal affairs of Sri Lanka, especially in regards to the country's civil war against the rebel Liberation Tigers of Tamil Eelam. He took the initiative of briefing members of the Sub Committee on Asia and the Pacific of the US House of Representatives in this respect.

=== Support for American Samoa's independence ===
In 2012, both Faleomavaega and Togiola Tulafono, American Samoa's Governor, called for the populace to consider a move towards autonomy if not independence, to a mixed response.

=== Support for Bahrain's monarchy ===
Faleomavaega was known for his vocal support of Bahrain's monarchy during the Bahraini uprising. One of Faleomavaega's top campaign donors, William Nixon, is a Washington, D.C.-based lobbyist whose firm, Policy Impact Communications, founded the pro-monarchy Bahrain American Council. Faleomavaega has taken various paid trips to Bahrain to meet with the country's rulers.

== Legacy ==
=== VA Clinic ===
On March 31, 2017, President Donald Trump signed H.R. 1362 into law. H.R. 1362 names the VA clinic in Pago Pago, American Samoa, the "Faleomavaega Eni Fa'aua'a Hunkin VA Clinic". The bill was sponsored by Delegate Amata Coleman Radewagen, Faleomavaega's successor as representative from American Samoa, and co-sponsored by five others.

== Death ==
Faleomavaega suffered from complications that he said are from his exposure to Agent Orange during the Vietnam War. Faleomavaega's declining health was speculated to have contributed to his 2014 electoral defeat.

Faleomavaega died at the age of 73 on February 22, 2017. The cause of death was not specified. He was survived by his wife, 5 children, and 10 grandchildren.

== See also ==
- List of Delegates to the United States House of Representatives from American Samoa
- List of Asian Americans and Pacific Islands Americans in the United States Congress

Political offices
| Preceded by Tufele Liamatua | Lieutenant Governor of American Samoa; 1985–1989 | Succeeded by Galea'i Peni Poumele |
U.S. House of Representatives
| Preceded by Fofó Sunia | Delegate to the U.S. House of Representatives from American Samoa's at-large congressional district 1989–2015 | Succeeded by Amata Coleman Radewagen |
