= List of governors of American Samoa =

Head of state and of government the U.S. territory of American Samoa

Governor of American Samoa
- Territory seal

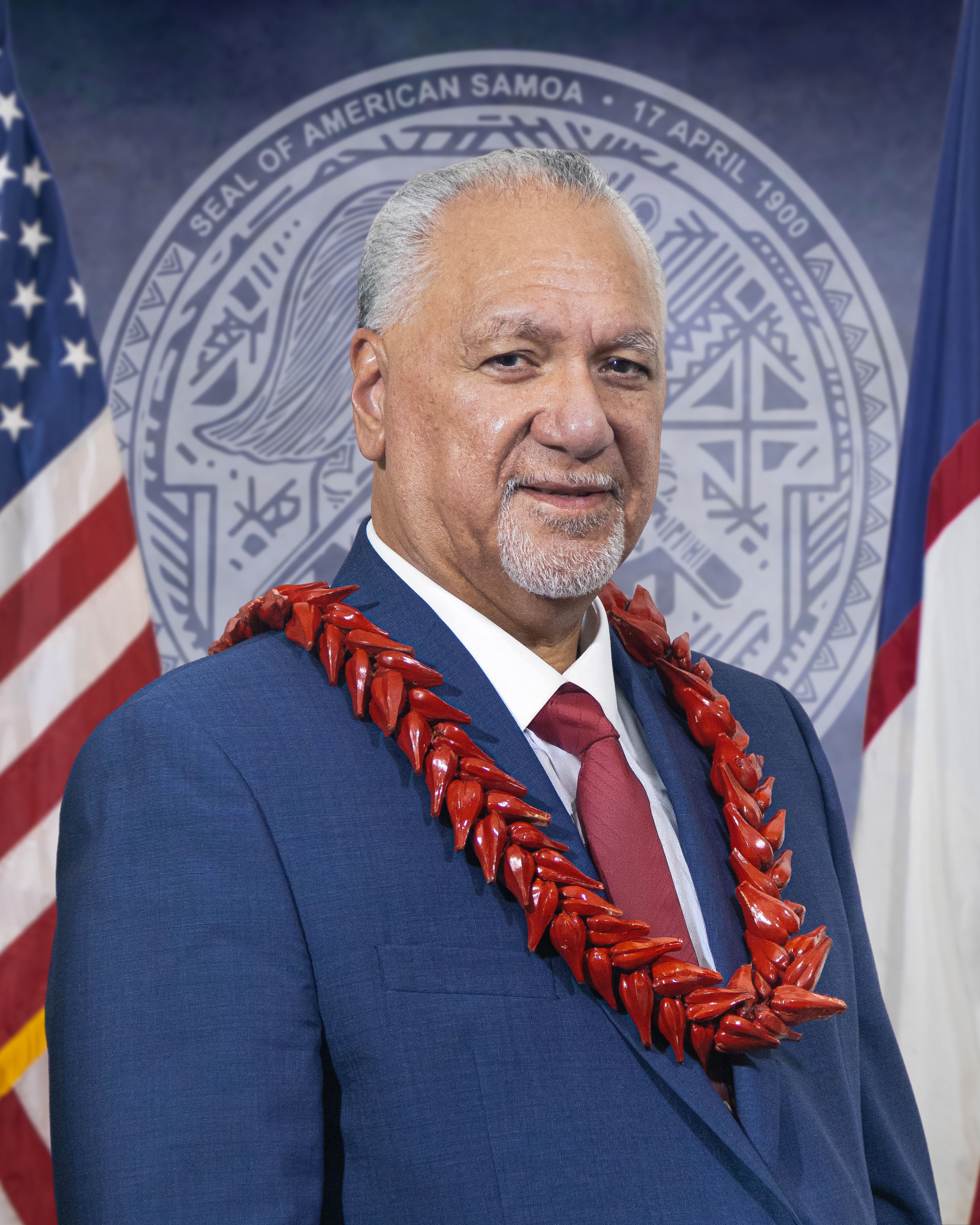
- Incumbent; Pula Nikolao Pula since January 3, 2025
- Residence: Government House, Pago Pago
- Appointer: General election
- Term length: 4 years, renewable once
- Precursor: Malietoa
- Formation: February 17, 1900
- First holder: Benjamin Franklin Tilley as Commandant
- Succession: Line of succession
- Deputy: Lieutenant Governor of American Samoa
- Website: Office of the Governor

This is a list of governors of the part of the Samoan Islands (now comprising American Samoa) under United States administration since 1900.

From 1900 to 1978 governors were appointed by the federal government of the United States. Since that time they have been elected for 4-year terms by the people of American Samoa.

== History ==
When the Department of the Interior sent four governors in a three-year period, local Samoans began advocating for choosing their own governors. In the late 1940s, a Navy Governor, as well as an Interior Governor, had expressed their beliefs that High Orator Chief Tuiasosopo would be a suitable governor. In 1956, President Dwight D. Eisenhower appointed Peter Tali Coleman as Governor of American Samoa, the first person of Samoan descent to occupy that role. Coleman, a member of the Republican Party, was a U.S. Army officer with a law degree from Georgetown University. After his presidential appointment, local residents became increasingly aware that Samoans can do the job just as good as the federal government, which until now had appointed governors to the islands. Soon local lawmakers such as Governor Owen Aspinall and H. Rex Lee favored the idea of locals being elected governors. On the other side was Governor John Morse Haydon, who openly opposed the idea. An administrative judge criticized Haydon and following a Pago Pago hearing, the Department of the Interior began distancing itself from Haydon and soon replaced him with a new governor. The concept of an elected governor was proposed with Senate Bill 20 and a Gubernatorial Commission was created in order to consider ways to implement the concept of electing governors.

In a 1977 article from the New York Times, it describes how opposition to an appointed Governor began with the appointment of Earl B. Ruth. Within eighteen months, the congressman from North Carolina had removed several Samoans in administrative posts, who had been appointed by former Governor John Morse Haydon. Governor Ruth was soon recalled to Washington, D.C. and was later quoted for having called Samoans "lazy, thieving liars." After having turned down the proposal to elect their own Governor in three plebiscites, American Samoans in a 1976 referendum overwhelmingly approved the measure in which allowed them to elect that official. The first popularly elected Governor was Peter Tali Coleman that same year.

Te'o J. Fuavai was one of the earliest proponents of the movement to elect governors in American Samoa, as opposed to governors being appointed by the federal government. Fuavai sponsored a resolution that proposed the Department of the Interior to permit elections.

== Appointed governors (1900–1978) ==
=== Naval administrators (1900–1951) ===
Term	Portrait	Incumbent	Notes
February 17, 1900 – November 27, 1901		Benjamin Franklin Tilley, Commandant	April 17, 1900: Treaty of Cession of Tutuila
November 27, 1901 – December 16, 1902		Uriel Sebree, Commandant	
December 16, 1902 – May 5, 1903		Henry Minett, acting Commandant	
May 5, 1903 – January 30, 1905		Edmund Beardsley Underwood, Commandant/Governor	July 16, 1904: Treaty of Cession of Manu'a
January 30, 1905 – May 21, 1908		Charles Brainard Taylor Moore, Governor	
May 21, 1908 – November 10, 1910		John Frederick Parker, Governor	
November 10, 1910 – March 14, 1913		William Michael Crose, Governor	July 17, 1911: U.S. Naval Station Tutuila renamed American Samoa
March 14 – July 14, 1913		Nathan Post, acting Governor	First term
July 14, 1913 – October 2, 1914		Clark Daniel Stearns, Governor	
October 2, 1914 – December 6, 1914		Nathan Post, acting Governor	Second term
December 6, 1914 – March 1, 1915		Charles Armijo Woodruff, acting Governor	
March 1, 1915 – June 10, 1919		John Martin Poyer, Governor	
June 10, 1919 – November 3, 1920		Warren Terhune, Governor	Committed suicide
November 11, 1920 – March 1, 1922		Waldo A. Evans, Governor	
March 1, 1922 – September 4, 1923		Edwin Taylor Pollock, Governor	
September 4, 1923 – March 17, 1925		Edward Stanley Kellogg, Governor	
March 17, 1925 – September 9, 1927		Henry Francis Bryan, Governor	
September 9, 1927 – August 2, 1929		Stephen Victor Graham, Governor	February 20, 1929: U.S. Congress recognized the cession of Tutuila and Manu'a by their chiefs, with retrospective to 16 July 1904.
August 2, 1929 – March 24, 1931		Gatewood Lincoln, Governor	First term
March 24 – April 22, 1931		James Sutherland Spore, acting Governor	
April 22 – July 17, 1931		Arthur Emerson, acting Governor	
July 17, 1931 – May 12, 1932		Gatewood Lincoln, Governor	Second term
May 12, 1932 – April 10, 1934		George Landenberger, Governor	
April 10–17, 1934		Thomas C. Latimore, acting Governor	
April 17, 1934 – January 15, 1936		Otto Dowling, Governor	
January 15–20, 1936		Thomas Benjamin Fitzpatrick, acting Governor	
January 20, 1936 – June 3, 1938		MacGillivray Milne, Governor	
June 26, 1938 – July 30, 1940		Edward Hanson, Governor	
July 30 – August 8, 1940		Jesse Wallace, acting Governor	
August 8, 1940 – June 5, 1942		Laurence Wild, Governor	Henry Louis Larsen served as Military Governor from January 17 to April 25, 1942
June 5, 1942 – February 8, 1944		John Gould Moyer, Governor	
February 8, 1944 – January 27, 1945		Allen Hobbs, Governor	
January		Ralph Hungerford, Governor	
September 3–10, 1945		Samuel Canan, acting Governor	
September 10, 1945 – April 22, 1947		Harold Houser, Governor	
April 22, 1947 – June 15, 1949		Vernon Huber, Governor	
July 7, 1949 – February 23, 1951		Thomas Darden, Governor	

=== Civilian governors (1951–1978) ===
Portrait	Governor	Took office	Left office	Party
	Phelps Phelps (1897–1981)	February 23, 1951	June 20, 1952	Republican
	John C. Elliott (1919–2001)	July 16, 1952	November 23, 1952	Democratic
	James Arthur Ewing (1916–1996)	November 28, 1952	March 4, 1953	Democratic
	Lawrence M. Judd (1887–1968)	March 4, 1953	August 5, 1953	Republican
	Richard Barrett Lowe (1902–1972)	August 5, 1953	October 15, 1956	Republican
	Peter Tali Coleman (1919–1997)	October 13, 1956	May 24, 1961	Republican
	H. Rex Lee (1910–2001)	May 24, 1961	July 31, 1967	Democratic
	Owen Aspinall (1927–1997)	August 1, 1967	July 31, 1969	Democratic
	John Morse Haydon (1920–1991)	August 1, 1969	October 14, 1974	Republican
	Frank Mockler (1909–1993) (acting)	October 14, 1974	February 6, 1975	Republican
	Earl B. Ruth (1916–1989)	February 6, 1975	September 30, 1976	Republican
	Frank Barnett (1933–2016)	October 1, 1976	May 27, 1977	Republican
	H. Rex Lee (1910–2001)	May 28, 1977	January 3, 1978	Democratic

== Elected governors (1978–present) ==
S. No.	Portrait	Governor	Tenure	Party	Elected	Lieutenant Governor
1		Peter Tali Coleman (1919–1997)	January 3, 1978 – January 3, 1985	Republican	1977; 1980	Tufele Liamatua
2		A. P. Lutali (1919–2002)	January 3, 1985 – January 2, 1989	Democratic	1984	Eni Faleomavaega
3		Peter Tali Coleman (1919–1997)	January 2, 1989 – January 3, 1993	Republican	1988	Galea'i Peni Poumele
3		Peter Tali Coleman (1919–1997)	January 2, 1989 – January 3, 1993	Republican	1988	Gaioi Tufele Galeai
4		A. P. Lutali (1919–2002)	January 3, 1993 – January 3, 1997	Democratic	1992	Tauese Sunia
5		Tauese Sunia (1941–2003)	January 3, 1997 – March 26, 2003	Democratic	1996; 2000	Togiola Tulafono
–		Togiola Tulafono (born 1947)	March 26, 2003 – April 7, 2003	Democratic	2004; 2008	Himself
6		Togiola Tulafono (born 1947)	April 7, 2003 – January 3, 2013	Democratic	2004; 2008	Faoa Aitofele Sunia
7		Lolo Matalasi Moliga (1947–2026)	January 3, 2013 – January 3, 2021	Independent	2012; 2016	Lemanu Peleti Mauga
7		Lolo Matalasi Moliga (1947–2026)	January 3, 2013 – January 3, 2021	Democratic	2012; 2016	Lemanu Peleti Mauga
8		Lemanu Peleti Mauga (born 1960)	January 3, 2021 – January 3, 2025	Democratic	2020	Eleasalo Ale
9		Pula Nikolao Pula (born 1955)	January 3, 2025 – present	Republican	2024	Pulu Ae Ae Jr.

== See also ==
- List of American Samoa Fono
