= 2026 American Samoa elections =

- November 3, 2026

The 2026 American Samoa elections were held on November 3, 2026 in the U.S. territory of American Samoa to elect a non-voting delegate to the U.S. House of Representatives and members of the Fono, American Samoa's bicameral legislature.

== Federal office ==
=== United States House of Representatives ===
- 2026 United States House of Representatives election in American Samoa

== Statewide office ==
=== House of Representatives ===
2026 American Samoa House of Representatives election
- November 3, 2026

20 of 21 seats in the House of Representatives
	First party
Party	Nonpartisan
Incumbents running	20
- Results by district Incumbent running Not popularly elected
Speaker before election
Savali Talavou Ale (Republican)
Elected Speaker
TBD

All 20 seats in the House of Representatives were up for election. All twenty incumbent representatives ran for re-election.

District	Candidate	Votes	%	Notes
1 – Manuʻa (2 seats)	Fetu Fetui Jr.			Incumbent
1 – Manuʻa (2 seats)	Vala Liusamoa			Incumbent
1 – Manuʻa (2 seats)	Paepaetele Mapu Saei Jamias			
1 – Manuʻa (2 seats)	Mana’oimalo Fa’aaliga Matagi			
1 – Manuʻa (2 seats)	Satia Aokuso Satia			
2 – Manuʻa	Tiaoalii Fauagiga Sai			Incumbent
2 – Manuʻa	Niuatoa Loleni Faiai			
3 – Vaifanua	Shaun Onosa'i Vaa			Incumbent
3 – Vaifanua	Toafa Vaiaga’e			
4 – Saʻole	Va'asa Simanu			Incumbent
4 – Saʻole	Titialiʻi Kitara Vaiau			
4 – Saʻole	Vitolio Ioane Lotu			
5 – Suʻa #1	Luaitaua Gene Pan			Incumbent
5 – Suʻa #1	Lynn Pulou-Alaimalo			
6 – Suʻa #2	Avagafono Tuavao Vaimaga Maiava			Incumbent
6 – Suʻa #2	Avaolagi Ta’atiatia I.Mata’utia Sua			
7 – Maʻopūtasi #1	Vailoata Eteuati Amituanaʻi			Incumbent
8 – Maʻopūtasi #2	Malaeoletalu Melesio Gurr			Incumbent
8 – Maʻopūtasi #2	Leiviifiloa Mariota Tuiasosopo			
9 – Maʻopūtasi #3	Trude Ledoux-Sunia			Incumbent
10 – Maʻopūtasi #4	Tapai Alailepule Benjamin Vaivao			Incumbent
10 – Maʻopūtasi #4	Saena Omar Shalhout			
10 – Maʻopūtasi #4	Talali Wightman-Uia			
11 – Maʻopūtasi #5	Faimealelei Anthony Fuʻe Allen			Incumbent
11 – Maʻopūtasi #5	Muaiavaona Fofoga Pila			
12 – Itūʻau (2 seats)	Tautoloitua Sauasetoa Ho Ching			Incumbent
12 – Itūʻau (2 seats)	Manumaua Wayne C. Wilson			Incumbent
13 – Fofo	Fiu Saelua			Incumbent
14 – Alataua	Savali Talavou Ale			Incumbent
14 – Alataua	Mona Uli			
15 – Tuālāuta (2 seats)	Larry Sanitoa			Incumbent
15 – Tuālāuta (2 seats)	Ben Vaomu Sauvao			Incumbent
15 – Tuālāuta (2 seats)	Sefulu Mika Kelemete			
15 – Tuālāuta (2 seats)	Tapusalaia Moemalemalo Maneafaiga			
15 – Tuālāuta (2 seats)	Alex Sene Jr.			
16 – Tuālātai	Manavaalofa Tutuila Manase			Incumbent
17 – Leasina / Aitulagi	Ape Mike Asifoa			Incumbent
17 – Leasina / Aitulagi	Fuasalli Iose			
Source: Election Office
