= 2020 American Samoan general election =

- November 3, 2020
- Gubernatorial election
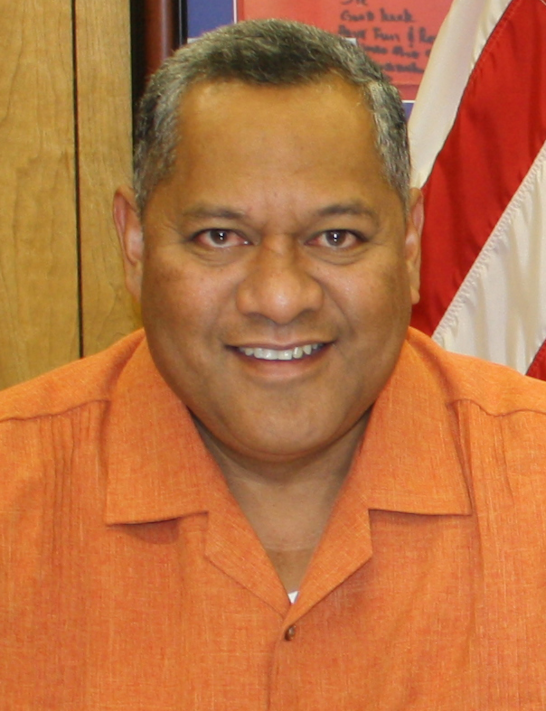

| Nominee | Lemanu Peleti Mauga | Gaoteote Palaie Tofau |
| Party | Independent | Independent |
| Alliance | Democratic |
| Running mate | Eleasalo Ale | Faiivae Iuli Alex Godinet |
| Popular vote | 7,154 | 2,594 |
| Percentage | 60.31% | 21.87% |
| Nominee | Iʻaulualo Faʻafetai Talia | Nuanuaolefeagaiga Saoluaga T. Nua |
| Party | Independent | Independent |
| Running mate | Tapaʻau Dr. Dan Mageo Aga | Tapumanaia Galu Satele Jr. |
| Popular vote | 1,461 | 652 |
| Percentage | 12.32% | 5.50% |
- Results by voting district: Mauga: 40–45% 45–50% 50–55% 55–60% 60–65% 65–70% 70–75% Tofau: 45–50% Talia: 60–65%
Governor before election
Lolo Matalasi Moliga
Democratic
Elected Governor
Lemanu Peleti Mauga
Democratic
- Delegate election
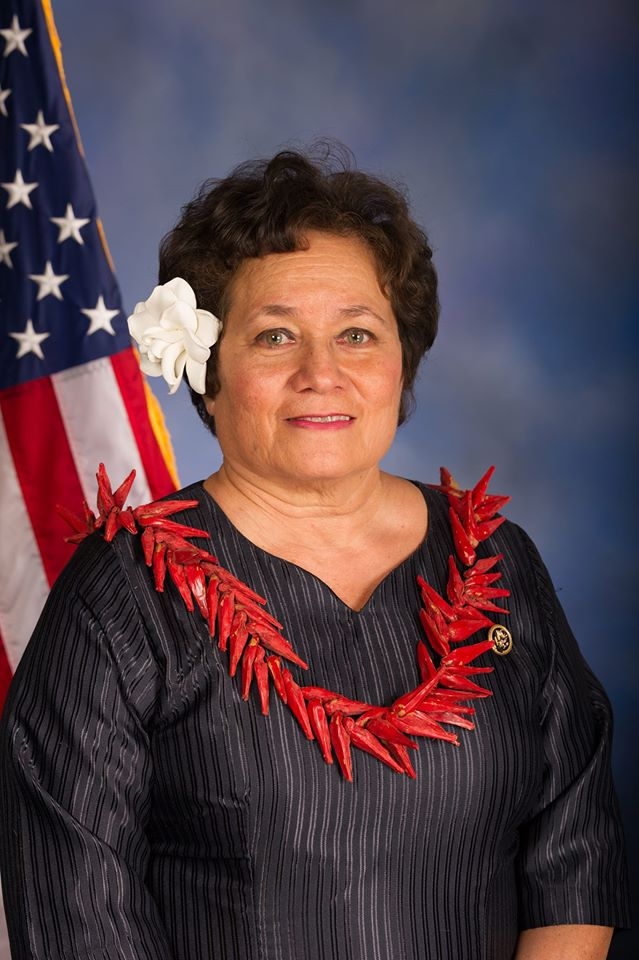

| Candidate | Amata Coleman Radewagen | Oreta Crichton |
| Party | Republican | Democratic |
| Popular vote | 9,880 | 1,704 |
| Percentage | 83.5% | 14.4% |
- Results by voting district: Radewagen: 55–60% 75–80% 80–85% 85–90%
Delegate before election
Amata Coleman Radewagen
Republican
Elected Delegate
Amata Coleman Radewagen
Republican

General elections were held in American Samoa on 3 November 2020. Voters elected a governor and lieutenant governor, members of the House of Representatives and the American Samoan delegate to the United States Congress.

Incumbent Governor of American Samoa Lolo Matalasi Moliga was not eligible for reelection due to term limits. Instead, the previous lieutenant governor Lemanu Peleti Mauga was elected governor, and the former attorney general, Salo Ale, was elected lieutenant governor with more than 60 percent of the vote. Both were affiliated with the Democratic Party and beat two non-partisan tickets, while the candidate affiliated with the Republican Party, Nuanuaolefeagaiga Saoluaga T. Nua, only placed fourth.

Incumbent delegate, Rep. Amata Coleman Radewagen, a Republican who had held the seat since 2015, was overwhelmingly re-elected to the United States House of Representatives for a fourth term.

As of 2026, this marks the most recent time Democrats have won a statewide election in American Samoa and the most recent time a democrat affiliated candidate was elected as the Governor of American Samoa.

== Background ==
In November 2014 Amata Coleman Radewagen defeated 10-term incumbent Democratic Rep. Eni Faleomavaega in a crowded race for the seat. She won re-election to a third term in 2018.

== Candidates ==
=== Governor ===
Gubernatorial candidates run on a non-partisan basis and as a slate together with their lieutenant governor candidate. Four political tickets qualified for the 2020 election. Although candidates do affiliate with national political parties, the gubernatorial election is held on a nonpartisan basis.

- Gaoteote Palaie Tofau, President of the American Samoa Senate
  - Running mate: Faiivae Iuli Alex Godinet, state senator
- Iʻaulualo Faʻafetai Talia, executive director of the American Samoa Government's Employee Retirement Fund
  - Running mate: Tapaʻau Dr. Dan Mageo Aga, director of the American Samoa Government's Office of Political Status, Constitutional Review and Federal Relations
- Lemanu Peleti Mauga, Lieutenant Governor of American Samoa, affiliated with the Democratic Party
  - Running mate: Salo Ale, former Attorney General of American Samoa
- Nuanuaolefeagaiga Saoluaga T. Nua, state senator and former Speaker of the American Samoa House of Representatives, affiliated with the Republican Party
  - Running mate: Tapumanaia Galu Satele Jr., former state representative

=== Not-qualified candidates ===
Fatumalala L. A. Al-Shehri, Independent candidate for American Samoa's at-large congressional district in 2012, had announced plans to run with Leah A. Smith, missionary for the Assembly of God Church, as her running mate on the first all-woman ticket, but they were not on the list of qualified candidates released by the American Samoa Election Office after the filing deadline.

=== Delegate ===
The deadline for candidates to file with the Election Office was September 1, 2020. Three candidates filed to run for election to American Samoa's lone seat in the United States House of Representatives by the official deadline, as determined by Chief Election Officer, Dr. Lealofi Uiagalelei. A fourth candidate, Lealofi Seau, a retired member of the United States military, announced his candidacy in July 2020, but did not qualify for the ballot by the deadline.

==== Democratic ====
- Oreta Tufuga Mapu Crichton, former Chief Procurement Officer (CPO) for the American Samoan Government (ASG) from 2015 to July 2020
  - Crichton resigned as CPO on July 17, 2020, to seek election as Delegate. She officially launched her campaign on September 12, 2020
- Meleagi Suitonu-Chapman, retired U.S. federal government employee
  - Suitonu-Chapman launched her campaign in July 2020, marking her fourth campaign for Delegate to the U.S. House. She most recently ran for the office in 2018. Suitonu-Chapman announced her candidacy in San Diego, California, as COVID-19 travel restrictions prevented her from returning to American Samoa at the time, and she remained stranded on the United States mainland for the duration of the election.

==== Republican ====
- Amata Coleman Radewagen, incumbent Delegate in the United States House of Representatives
  - Announced her intention to seek re-election in June 2020

== Campaign ==
On January 25, 2019, Senator Nuanuaolefeagaiga announced his candidacy.

I’aulualo Fa’afetai Talia announced his candidacy at a campaign news media event at Sadie's by the Sea on July 28, 2019.

Gaoteote Palaie Tofau announced his candidacy on February 9, 2020.

== Results ==
=== Governor and lieutenant governor ===
The governor of American Samoa is elected on a ticket with the lieutenant governor. Although candidates do affiliate with national political parties, they are elected on a nonpartisan basis.

| Candidate | Running mate | Votes | % |
|---|---|---|---|
| Lemanu Peleti Mauga | Eleasalo Ale | 7,154 | 60.32 |
| Gaoteote Palaie Tofau | Faiivae Iuli Alex Godinet | 2,594 | 21.87 |
| Iʻaulualo Faʻafetai Talia | Tapaʻau Dr. Dan Mageo Aga | 1,461 | 12.32 |
| Nuanuaolefeagaiga Saoluaga T. Nua | Tapumanaia Galu Satele Jr. | 652 | 5.50 |
| Total | | 11,861 | 100.00 |

=== Fono House of Representatives ===
The House of Representatives is the lower house of the American Samoa Fono (legislature). Although candidates do affiliate with national political parties, they are elected on a nonpartisan basis.

| District | Candidate | Votes | % |
|---|---|---|---|
| 1 – Manuʻa | Fetu Fetui Jr. | 358 | 30.2 |
| 1 – Manuʻa | Alumamalu Ale Seā Filoialiʻi | 283 | 23.9 |
| 1 – Manuʻa | Vesi Talalelei Fautanu Jr. | 282 | 23.8 |
| 1 – Manuʻa | Mapu S. Jamias | 262 | 22.1 |
| 2 – Manuʻa | Tiaoalii Fauagiga Sai | 225 | 58.7 |
| 2 – Manuʻa | Sualevai Nofoaiga Sualevai | 158 | 41.3 |
| 3 – Vaifanua | Lavea Fatulegaeʻe Palepoli Mauga | 274 | 43.2 |
| 3 – Vaifanua | Tupua Shawn Vaʻa | 210 | 33.1 |
| 3 – Vaifanua | Suaese "Pooch" Taʻase | 150 | 23.6 |
| 4 – Saole | Titialiʻi Kitara Vaiau | 312 | 65.8 |
| 4 – Saole | Vaʻasa Simanu EdD | 162 | 34.2 |
| 5 – Sua #1 | Luaitaua Gene Pan | 310 | 62.6 |
| 5 – Sua #1 | Fialupe Felila Fiaui Lutu | 152 | 30.7 |
| 5 – Sua #1 | Faʻalae Lauatuaʻa Koneseti Tunupopo | 33 | 0.7 |
| 6 – Sua #2 | Avagafono Tuavao Vaimaga Maiava | 190 | 56.2 |
| 6 – Sua #2 | Loia Gutu | 148 | 43.8 |
| 7 – Maʻoputasi #1 | Vailoata Eteuati Amituanaʻi | 284 | 68.8 |
| 7 – Maʻoputasi #1 | Tuika Tuika | 129 | 31.2 |
| 8 – Maʻoputasi #2 | Vailiuama Steve Leasiolagi | 197 | 41.7 |
| 8 – Maʻoputasi #2 | Ifopo Maugaoaliʻi Sipa Anoaʻi | 195 | 41.3 |
| 8 – Maʻoputasi #2 | Agalelei Latu Fatuesi | 53 | 11.2 |
| 8 – Maʻoputasi #2 | Wayne Malaetasi Ames | 27 | 5.7 |
| 9 – Maʻoputasi #3 | VesiaʻI Poyer S. Samuelu | 503 | 67.2 |
| 9 – Maʻoputasi #3 | Veʻevalu Meauta Lauoi Mageo | 246 | 32.8 |
| 10 – Maʻoputasi #4 | Vaetasi Tuʻumolimoli S. Moliga | 116 | 47.5 |
| 10 – Maʻoputasi #4 | Tapai Alailepule Benjamin Vaivao | 112 | 45.9 |
| 10 – Maʻoputasi #4 | Tina FaisiotamoʻI Vivao Ioane | 16 | 6.6 |
| 11 – Maʻoputasi #5 | Faimealelei Anthony Fuʻe Allen | 295 | 67.0 |
| 11 – Maʻoputasi #5 | Sauafea Sonny Sauafea | 145 | 33.0 |
| 12 – Ituʻau | Manumaua Wayne C. Wilson | 1,018 | 37.2 |
| 12 – Ituʻau | Logoituau Mark Timoteo Atafua | 714 | 26.1 |
| 12 – Ituʻau | Andrew Earnest Thompson | 522 | 19.1 |
| 12 – Ituʻau | Sala Sataua Dr. Mataese Samuelu | 456 | 16.6 |
| 13 – Fofo | Andra Samoa | 587 | 64.6 |
| 13 – Fofo | Puletumalo Dick S. Koko | 321 | 35.4 |
| 14 – Lealataua | Savali Talavou Ale | 294 | 58.6 |
| 14 – Lealataua | Ethan Lake | 167 | 33.3 |
| 14 – Lealataua | Faleomavaega Nicholas King Jr. | 26 | 5.2 |
| 14 – Lealataua | Andrew Mulivai Autele | 15 | 3.0 |
| 15 – Tualauta | Larry Simou Sanitoa | 1,746 | 39.4 |
| 15 – Tualauta | Samuel Ioka Ale Meleisea | 1,222 | 27.6 |
| 15 – Tualauta | Alex M. Sene Jr. | 555 | 12.5 |
| 15 – Tualauta | Vui Florence Vaili Saulo | 547 | 12.4 |
| 15 – Tualauta | Bartley Papaliʻi Suʻa Lucia | 247 | 5.6 |
| 15 – Tualauta | Saili Sione Samo | 112 | 2.5 |
| 16 – Tualatai | Manavaalofa Tutuila Manase | 357 | 49.4 |
| 16 – Tualatai | Timusā Tini C. Lam Yuen | 291 | 40.2 |
| 16 – Tualatai | Rachael Manning Key | 75 | 10.4 |
| 17 – Leasina | Ape Mike Asifoa | 255 | 57.8 |
| 17 – Leasina | Gafatasi Afalava | 186 | 42.2 |

=== Delegate ===
The Delegate to the United States Congress represents American Samoa's at-large congressional district in the U.S. House of Representatives.

| Candidate | Party | Votes | % |
|---|---|---|---|
| Amata Coleman Radewagen | Republican Party | 9,880 | 83.50 |
| Oreta Chrichton | Democratic Party | 1,704 | 14.40 |
| Meleagi Suitonu-Chapman | Democratic Party | 249 | 2.10 |
| Total | | 11,833 | 100.00 |
Source: Samoa News

== See also ==
- 2020 United States gubernatorial elections
