= 2014 American Samoan general election =

- November 4, 2014
- Delegate election
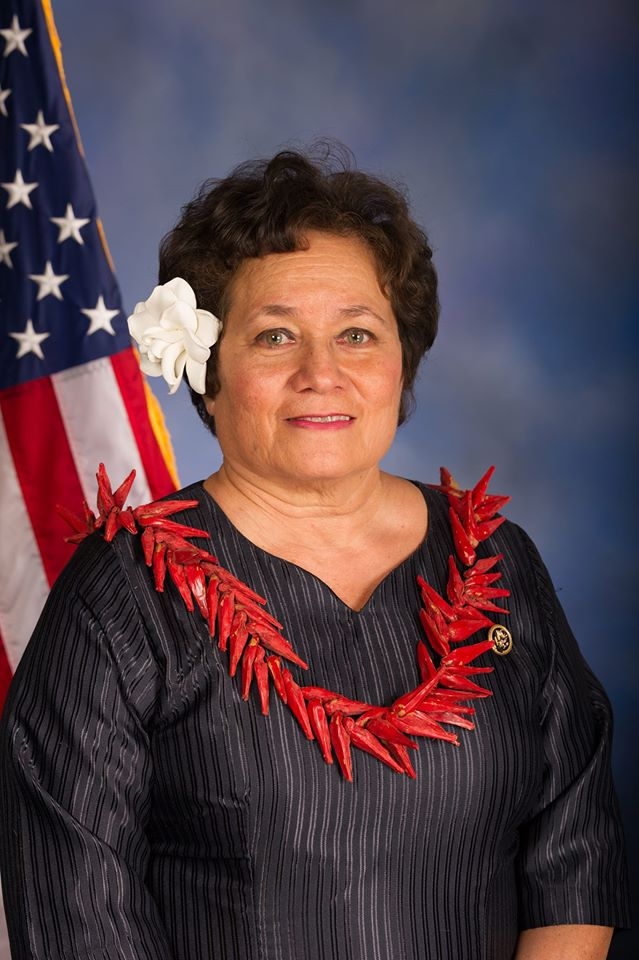

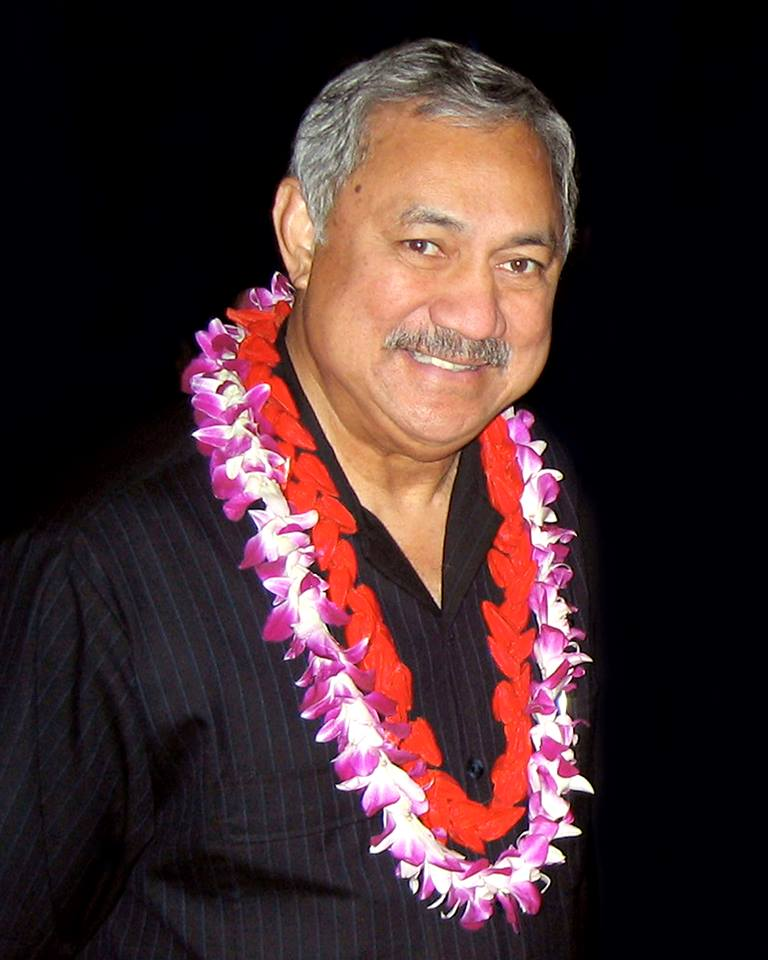

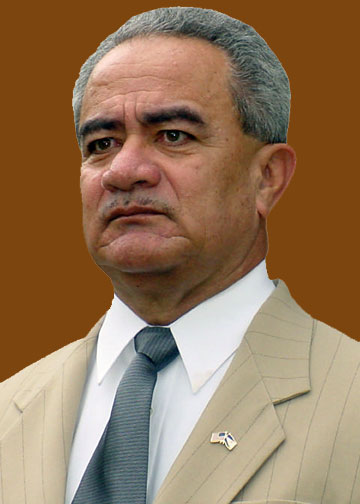
Candidate	Amata Coleman Radewagen	Eni Faleomavaega
Party	Republican	Democratic
Popular vote	4,306	3,157
Percentage	42.03%	30.81%
Candidate	Togiola Tulafono	Mapu S. Jamias
Party	Democratic	Democratic
Popular vote	1,130	652
Percentage	11.03%	6.36%
- Results by voting district: Radewagen: 35–40% 40–45% 45–50% 50–55% 55–60% 60–65% 65–70% Faleomavaega: 30–35% 50–55%
Delegate before election
Eni Faleomavaega
Democratic
Elected Delegate
Amata Coleman Radewagen
Republican

General elections were held in American Samoa on 4 November 2014, alongside a constitutional referendum. Voters elected members of the Fono and the American Samoan delegate to the United States Congress.

== Results ==
=== House of Representatives ===
District	Candidate	Votes	%	Notes
1 – Manu'a	Fetu Fetui Jr.	409		Elected
1 – Manu'a	Vesi Talalelei Fautanu Jr.	366		Elected
1 – Manu'a	I’aulualo Fa’afetai Talia	329		
2 – Manu'a	Toea’ina F. Autele	256		Elected
2 – Manu'a	Le’autu Segila P. Vaeao	102		
3 – Vaifanua	Legae’e Mauga	368		Elected
3 – Vaifanua	Ugaitafa Simei Pulu	191		
4 – Saole	Talaimatai Elisara Su’a	188		Elected
4 – Saole	Kitara Vaiau	158		
4 – Saole	Sagatu Thompson	69		
5 – Sua	Puleleiite Lia Tufele Jr.	172		Elected
5 – Sua	Tuialofi Faalae Lauatua’a Tunupopo	124		
5 – Sua	Fale S. Uele	99		
5 – Sua	Ketesemane Meaole	86		
5 – Sua	Lily Memea Hunt	8		
6 – Sua	Lemapu Suiaunoa Talo	188		
6 – Sua	Matagi David Sialega Mauga	173		
7 – Maoputasi	Vailoata Eteuati Amituana’i	362		Elected
8 – Maoputasi	Maugaoali’i Sipa Anoa’i	224		Elected
8 – Maoputasi	Vailiuama Steve Leasiolagi	168		
8 – Maoputasi	Don Fuimaono Lutu	57		
9 – Maoputasi	Meauta Lauoi Mageo			
9 – Maoputasi	Va’amua Henry Sesepasara			
10 – Maoputasi	Tu’umolimoli S. Moliga	177		
11 – Maoputasi	Faimealelei Anthony Fu’e Allen	304		Elected
11 – Maoputasi	Maloiseuga Tanielu Fagamanu Unutoa	79		
12 – Ituau	Manumaua Wayne Wilson	612		Elected
12 – Ituau	Mulinu’u Vae’iaitu Filo Maluia	607		Elected
12 – Ituau	Archie Taotasi Soliai	596		
12 – Ituau	Fagasoaia Foa Akai Lealaitafea	527		
13 – Fofo	Puletu D. Koko	290		Elected
13 – Fofo	Fagaoatua Dorian T. Salave’a	241		
13 – Fofo	Andra Samoa	210		
13 – Fofo	Pogia Tusi P. Suiaunoa	89		
13 – Fofo	Johanna Samana	17		
14 – Lealataua	Fatumalala L. Al-Shehri			
14 – Lealataua	Samatua Edwin Hollister			
14 – Lealataua	Savali Talavou Ale			Elected
15 – Tualauta	Larry Simou Sanitoa	1,288		Elected
15 – Tualauta	Vui Florence Tuaumu Saulo	877		Elected
15 – Tualauta	Leomiti Faitama’i Leomiti	465		
15 – Tualauta	Bartley Su’a Lusia	441		
16 – Tualatai	Timusa Tini Lam Yuen	312		Elected
16 – Tualatai	Manavaalofa Tutuila Manase	283		
17 – Leasina	Atalina Asifoa	201		Elected
17 – Leasina	Atualevao Gafatasi Afalav	200		
Source: Election Office

=== Delegate ===
Candidate	Party	Votes	%
Amata Coleman Radewagen	Republican Party	4,306	42.03
Eni Faleomavaega	Democratic Party	3,157	30.81
Togiola Tulafono	Democratic Party	1,130	11.03
Mapu S. Jamias	Democratic Party	652	6.36
Rosie Fuala'au Tago Lancaster	Independent	268	2.62
Meleagi Suitonu-Chapman	Democratic Party	229	2.24
Tuika Tuika	Independent	201	1.96
Tu'au Kereti Mata'Utia Jr	Democratic Party	160	1.56
Mark Ude	Democratic Party	143	1.40
Total		10,246	100.00
