= Tapumanaia Galu Satele Jr. =

American Samoan politician

Tapumanaia Galu Satele

Member of the American Samoa House of Representatives from the 15th district
- In office 2008–2012
- Succeeded by: Larry Sanitoa

Personal details
- Born: Utulei, American Samoa
- Spouse: Cassandra Solaita
- Children: Six
- Education: Eastern Oregon University (B.A.); University of Hawaiʻi (M.Ed.)

Tapumanaia Galu Satele Jr. is an American politician, educator, and government administrator who served as a member of the American Samoa House of Representatives from 2008 to 2012. After leaving the American Samoa Fono, Satele has served in several cabinet positions in the Government of American Samoa.

== Early life and education ==
Satele was born and raised in Utulei, American Samoa. He earned a Bachelor of Arts degree in general studies from Eastern Oregon University and Master of Education from the University of Hawaiʻi at Mānoa.

== Career ==
After earning his master's degree, Satele worked as an admissions advisor for Remington College. He also worked as an academic representative for Remington College American Samoa. Satele later served as an administrative services deputy and academic counselor at American Samoa Community College. Satele served as a member of the American Samoa House of Representatives from 2008 to 2012, representing the 15th district. From 2012 to 2016, he served as deputy director of the American Samoa Department of Youth & Women's Affairs. Since 2016, he has served as director of the American Samoa Office of Protection and Advocacy for the Disabled. In 2017, Satele establish the "Love Thy Neighbor" project, delivering 1600 care packages to cannery workers.

In 2020, Satele announced his candidacy for Lieutenant Governor of American Samoa in the 2020 American Samoa gubernatorial election as the running mate of Nuanuaolefeagaiga Saoluaga T. Nua.

== Personal life ==
Satele is a member of the Church of Jesus Christ of Latter-day Saints. He and his wife, Cassandra Solaita-Satele, have six children. Coming from a political family, both his father Satele Galu Satele Sr., and his grandfather Tuanaitau F. Tuia, served in the American Samoan territorial legislature.
