= Elections in American Samoa =

The American Samoan Legislature or Fono has two chambers, the House of Representatives and the Senate, which has a directly elected head of government, the Governor of American Samoa.

The House of Representatives has 21 members, all elected for a two-year term. Fourteen of them are from single-seat districts, six are from dual-seat districts, and one is elected by a public meeting on Swain Island. The Senate has 18 members, elected for a four-year term by and from the chiefs of the islands. The Governor and their deputy, the Lieutenant Governor, are elected to a four-year term with a limit of two terms as governor.

Although individuals can and do affiliate with political parties, elections are held on a non-partisan basis, and candidates run without party labels. The governor and lieutenant governor are elected on a shared ticket.

As a U.S. territory, American Samoa also votes to send a non-voting delegate to the US House of Representatives, from American Samoa's at-large congressional district. The official head of state is the President of the United States. While American Samoans can vote in party primaries, they cannot vote in the general presidential election.

== Latest elections ==
In 2024, incumbent delegate to the U.S. House of Representatives Amata Coleman Radewagen won re-election to a sixth term with 74.8 percent of the votes.

Also in 2024, Republican Pula Nikolao Pula was elected governor, defeating incumbent governor Lemanu Peleti Mauga.

In 2018, a referendum seeking to amend the local constitution, and give the legislature the authority to override the governor's veto instead of the U.S. Secretary of Interior as happens now, was defeated.

== Reform proposal ==
In 2001, Congressman Eni Faleomavaega announced the introduction federal legislation to protect the voting rights of active duty military members whose home of residence is American Samoa. There have also been proposals to grant American Samoa a vote in the United States Congress, but these would likely face similar constitutional questions as proposals to grant the District of Columbia full representation in Congress.

== See also ==
- Electoral calendar
- Electoral system
- Political party strength in American Samoa
