= 2018 American Samoan constitutional referendum =

American Samoan ballot measure

- 6 November 2018
- Allow the Fono to override the veto of the Governor.

Results
Choice	Votes	%
Yes	2,605	30.43%
No	5,957	69.57%
Valid votes	8,562	99.12%
Invalid or blank votes	76	0.88%
Total votes	8,638	100.00%
Registered voters/turnout	15,542	55.58%

A constitutional referendum was held in American Samoa on 6 November 2018, alongside general elections. The proposed constitutional amendment would allow the Fono to override the veto of the Governor, a proposal which had previously been rejected by voters in referendums in 2008, 2010, 2012 and 2014. Voters again rejected the measure, with 70% voting against.

== Background ==
The proposal was that the power to override of the Governor's veto should be taken out of the hands of the American Secretary of the Interior and given to the Fono. The proposal had been rejected by the voters in referendums in 2008, 2010 and 2012. The rationale was often that the people were happy with the existing situation due to the Governor being directly elected but Fono Senators being elected by the counties.

On 2 October 2017 the Senate approved the proposal by a vote of 14–1. The House of Representatives approved it unanimously on 11 April 2018. The Governor Lolo Matalasi Moliga stated that he felt the reason why the motion had constantly failed in previous referenda in American Samoa was that the electorate did not understand what they were voting on. Accordingly, both houses of the Fono authorised the promotion of public information and awareness programmes. A number were held with handouts given to attendees. It was announced by the Governor that the referendum would be held on the same day as the 2018 American Samoan general election.

== Results ==
Despite the endorsement from the Governor, the Fono and the American Samoan Affairs Office, the public rejected the amendment in the referendum. The proposal failed with 78.3% of the voting electorate, voting against it.

Choice	Votes	%
For	2,605	30.43
Against	5,957	69.57
Invalid/blank votes	76	–
Total	8,638	100
Registered voters/turnout	15,542	55.58
Source: Direct Democracy
