= Vaivao =

Vaivao is a surname. Notable people with the surname include:

- Hannibal Vaivao (born 1987), American rugby union player
- Tapai Alailepule Benjamin Vaivao, American Samoan politician
- Jermaine Vaivao, the getaway driver in the 2024 Adass Israel Synagogue Firebombing in Melbourne
