= Te'o J. Fuavai =

American Samoa politician (1936–2019)

Aumoeualogo Te’o J. Fuavai (November 24, 1936 – June 12, 2019) was an American Samoa politician who represented the Republican Party of American Samoa and served as a member of the American Samoa House of Representatives, as a territorial Senator, and Speaker of the House of Representatives. He has also been the Commissioner of Public Safety, Director of Public Works, President of the American Samoa Rugby Union (1976-2019), Chairman of the Catholic Diocesan Council, and Chairman of the Republican Party of American Samoa.

He received the nickname “Tiger” from former Governor Peter T. Coleman, referring to his “fighting spirit and no-nonsense style.” He was also described as one who "ruled with an iron hand." He was one of the initial supporters of the movement to elect American Samoa Governors, as opposed to Governors being appointed by the federal government. He sponsored a resolution that asked the Department of the Interior to permit elections.

== Biography ==
=== Personal life ===
Te’o J. Fuavai was born on November 24, 1936. His father was a school teacher and Fuavai attended faife’au and elementary schools in several villages. He later attended the Marist School at Atu'u and completed at Le'ala and Samoana High School.

He was married to Fatuiva Allen and they have ten children and 18 grandchildren (as of 1998). Their traditional family home was located at Asofitu in Nuʻuuli village on Tutuila Island.

== Professional career ==
He began working for the American Samoa Government General Supply in 1956. Two years later, Fuavai became a Customs Officer and in 1964, he replaced John Faumuina, Sr. and became the Chief Customs Officer. At that time, the Customs Office was a division of the Department of Port Administration. He first entered the Fono in 1970. During his first term, he was successful in persuading the House of Representatives to establish a post of “Vice-Speaker of the House.” Fuavai later became the first Vice Speaker of the American Samoa House of Representatives in 1973–74. Fuavai became Speaker of the House the following year, 1975–76. He served from the 12th through the 17th Legislatures, having won five consecutive House elections.

During his time as Speaker of the American Samoa House of Representatives, he also served on the executive committee of the Pacific Conference of Legislators, which consisted of politicians from the Northern Mariana Islands, Guam, American Samoa, Hawai'i, and the Federated States of Micronesia.

In 1980, Fuavai left the Fono as he had been appointed Commissioner of Public Safety by Governor Peter T. Coleman. He was re-appointed to the same position by Governor A. P. Lutali in 1984 despite Lutali being a Democrat. He was once again appointed Commissioner of Public Safety by another Democratic Governor when Tauese Sunia appointed him in 1997. He stepped down in 2001 in order to become a Senate member representing Vaifanua County. He ran unsuccessfully for Governor in the 2004 elections. Before his death, he was an advisor for Senate President Gaoteote Palaie.

== Other work ==
He was the Director of Public Works from 1989 to 1992 and the General Manager of the Rainmaker Hotel in 1991–92. He also chaired a number of gubernatorial campaign committees, including for Governors Peter T. Coleman and Tauese Sunia. He was also the Chairman of the Republican Party of American Samoa for a number of years. In 1997, Fuavai was elected Chairman of the Diocese of Samoa-Pago Pago and served as treasurer for the Alao Parish for several years. Fuavai was the President of the American Samoa Rugby Union from 1976 until his death. He was a member of the federal Republican National Committee.

== Death ==
Fuavai died in Seattle, Washington on June 12, 2019.
