= Vesiai Poyer S. Samuelu =

American Samoan politician

Vesiai Poyer Samuelu

Member of the American Samoa House of Representatives from the 9th district
- Incumbent
- Assumed office January 3, 2023
- Succeeded by: Trude Ledoux-Sunia (elect)

Personal details
- Party: Nonpartisan

Vesiai Poyer Samuelu is an American Samoan politician who has served as a member of the American Samoa House of Representatives since 3 January 2023. He represents the 9th district.

== Electoral history ==
He was elected on November 8, 2022, in the 2022 American Samoan general election. He assumed office on 3 January 2023.

== Political Positions ==
Samelu proposed a bill that would require all House members to be assigned a committee by the Speaker. He has not been assigned to a committee as of 2019.

Political offices
Preceded by	Member of the American Samoa House of Representatives; 2022–present	Succeeded by incumbent
