= Seui Laau =

American Samoan politician (c.1942–2012)

Seui Laau (c. 1942 – January 26, 2012) was an American Samoan politician and Senator. Laau was the chairman of the American Samoa Senate Government Operations Committee at the time of his death in 2012. He had a wife, Palepa, and they had several children, including Rep. Larry Sanitoa, a member of the American Samoa House of Representatives.

Laau died at LBJ Medical Center in Faga'alu, American Samoa, at 11:30 p.m. on January 26, 2012, at the age of 69. A small service was held at the hospital chapel, attended by Governor Togiola Tulafono, First Lady Mary Ann Tulafono, village elders and members of the Senate.
