= VAA =

VAA may refer to:

- Vaagri Booli language, by ISO 639-3 code
- Vaasa Airport, Finland, by IATA code
- Van Andel Arena
- Viva Artists Agency, a talent agency in the Philippines
- Virgin Atlantic Airways
- Voting advice application
- Vietnam Aviation Academy

== See also ==
- Vaa (disambiguation)
- Va'a
- Vaas (disambiguation)
