= Meleisea =

Meleisea is a surname. Notable people with the surname include:

- Alrie Meleisea (born 1992), New Zealand professional boxer
- Malama Meleisea (fl. 1987–2022), Samoan historian and the author
- Samuel Ioka Ale Meleisea (born 1991), American Samoan politician
