= Tuaolo Manaia Fruean =

American Samoan politician (born 1945)

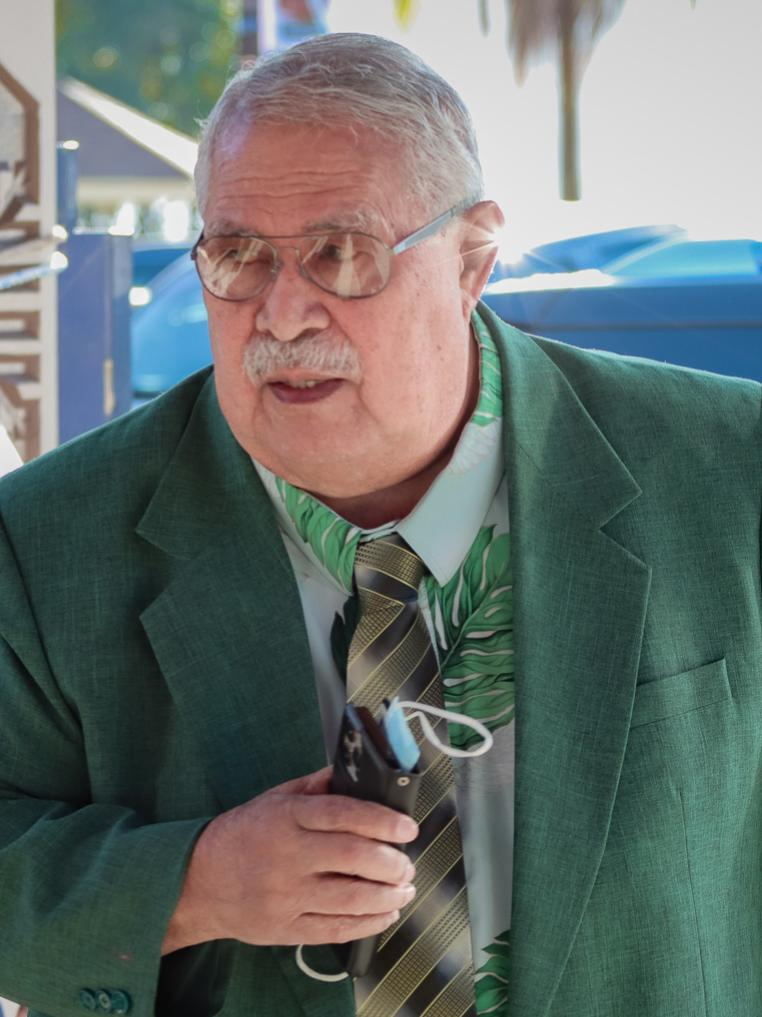

President of the American Samoa Senate
- Incumbent
- Assumed office January 8, 2021
- Preceded by: Gaoteote Palaie Tofau
- In office September 19, 2004 – January 2005; Acting
- Preceded by: Lutu T. S. Fuimaono
- Succeeded by: Lolo Matalasi Moliga

Member of the American Samoa Senate from the Maʻopūtasi County district
- Incumbent
- Assumed office June 2015
- Preceded by: Mauga Asuaga
- In office January 2001 – January 2009
- Preceded by: ???
- Succeeded by: Asuega Fa'amamata

Personal details
- Born: March 1945 (age 81)
- Party: Independent

Tuaolo Manaia Fruean (born March 1945) is an American Samoan politician, judge, and civil servant. He has served in both the American Samoa House of Representatives and the American Samoa Senate, and as Commissioner of Public Safety in the Cabinet of Governor Togiola Tulafono. Since 2021 he has been President of the American Samoa Senate.

Before entering politics Tuaolo was an associate judge of the High Court of American Samoa. He served as a member of the American Samoa House of Representatives for ten years, before being elected to the American Samoa Senate in the 2000 elections and serving as a Senator from 2001 to 2008. He served as president pro tempore of the Senate following the death of Senate President Lutu Tenari Fuimaono, and was a candidate for Senate President after the 2004 elections. He was not-elected in 2008, and was replaced as a Senator by Asuega Fa'amamata.

In 2009, he was nominated as Commissioner of Public Safety in the Cabinet of Governor Togiola Tulafono.

In July 2013, he was confirmed as American Samoa's Chief Election Officer.

In June 2015, he was re-elected to the Senate, replacing Mauga Tasi Asuega who had been appointed Secretary of Samoan Affairs. He was replaced as Election Commissioner by Lealofi Uiagalelei. He was re-elected to the Senate in the 2016 election, but was then nominated as Commissioner of Public Safety in the Cabinet of Governor Lolo Matalasi Moliga. He declined to accept the role, saying that he would prefer to remain as a Senator.

He was re-elected as a Senator in 2020. In January 2021, he was unanimously elected as President of the Senate.

Political offices
| Preceded by Lutu T. S. Fuimaono | President of the American Samoa Senate; Acting; 2004–2005 | Succeeded by Lolo Matalasi Moliga |
| Preceded by Gaoteote Palaie Tofau | President of the American Samoa Senate; 2021–present | Incumbent |
