= UTI (disambiguation) =

A UTI most commonly refers to a urinary tract infection.

UTI or Uti may also refer to:

== Science and technology ==
- Uniform Type Identifier, in Apple software
- Unique Transaction Identifier, in financial trading
- Ultrasound tongue imaging, in phonetics

== Companies ==
- Axis Bank (formerly UTI Bank), an Indian financial services multinational
- UTI Asset Management, an Indian mutual fund, former name Unit Trust of India
- Universal Technical Institute, an American automotive education provider
- UTI Holdings, a Romanian holding company

== People ==
- Uti Nwachukwu (born 1982), Nigerian Big Brother Africa contestant
- Uti Petelo, American Samoan politician
- Power Uti (born 1962), Nigerian wrestler
- Sunday Uti (born 1962), Nigerian sprinter

== See also ==
- UT1 (disambiguation)
