= Saelua =

Saelua is a surname. Notable people with the surname include:

- Fiu Saelua, American Samoan politician
- Jaiyah Saelua (born 1988), American Samoan footballer
