= Va'asa Simanu =

American Samoan politician

Member of the American Samoa House of Representatives from the 4th district
- Incumbent
- Assumed office January 3, 2025
- Preceded by: Titialiʻi Kitara Vaiau

Personal details
- Party: Nonpartisan

Va'asa Simanu is an American Samoan politician. She served in the American Samoa House of Representatives since 2025.
