= Vaa =

Vaa may refer to:

- Loch Vaa, a body of water in Highland, Scotland

== People with the surname ==
- Aslaug Vaa (1889–1965), Norwegian poet and playwright
- Dyre Vaa (1903–1980), Norwegian sculptor and painter
- Shaun Onosa'i Vaa, American Samoan politician

== See also ==
- VAA (disambiguation)
- Va'a
