= Lutu T. S. Fuimaono =

American politician

Lutu T.S. Fuimaono

Member of the American Samoa Senate
- In office 1977–2004

Personal details
- Born: Lutu Tenari S. Fuimaono; September 15, 1930 Fagatogo, American Samoa
- Died: September 19, 2004 (aged 74)
- Children: 8
- Education: Reedley College; American Samoa Community College

Military service
- Branch/service: United States Air Force
- Years of service: 1954–1958

Lutu Tenari S. Fuimaono (September 15, 1930 – September 19, 2004) was an American Samoa politician and journalist and the longest-serving legislator in the territory's history. He served as the President of the American Samoa Senate from 1996 until his death in 2004. Before being elected president, he served three terms in the American Samoa House of Representatives prior to becoming a senator.

== Early life and education ==
Fuimaono was born and raised in Fagatogo, where he attended Poyer School and the High School of American Samoa.

Upon graduating high school, Fuimaono moved to California, where he enrolled at Reedley College in Reedley, California, and later Automation Institution of California. He later served in the United States Air Force from 1954 to 1958.

== Career ==
In the mid-1960s, Fuimaono moved with his family back to American Samoa, where he attended American Samoa Community College while also being employed as a newscaster for television KVZK as well as radio station WVUV. He became the radio station’s manager in 1966. He also worked briefly as a meat inspector with the Food Safety and Inspection Service.

Fuimaono was later elected to the American Samoa House of Representatives where he served for three terms as the chief clerk. He was first elected to the American Samoa Senate in the 15th Legislature. He served as a senator for 19 years prior to being elected Senate President in 1996. During his first election for Senate President, he unsuccessfully ran against incumbent Letuli Toloa in January 1995. Upon Letuli’s death, Fuimaono was elected Senate President. Fuimaono won his first full term in January 1997 and served until his death in September 2004.

== Personal life ==
He married his wife Sinira Talatonu in California. They had eight children.
