= Fetui =

Fetui is a surname. Notable people with the surname include:

- Fetu Fetui Jr., American Samoan politician
- Zion Tupuola-Fetui (born 2000), American football linebacker
