= Samuelu =

Samuelu may refer to:

- Samuelu Laloniu (born 1969), Tuvaluan diplomat
- Samuelu Malo, (born 1999), Samoan footballer
- Samuelu Teo, Tuvaluan politician
- Tufuga Samuelu Atoa (1927–1998), Samoan civil servant, educator, and sports administrator
- Fuimaono Teo Samuelu, Samoan politician
- Vesiai Poyer S. Samuelu, American Samoan politician
