= 2022 American Samoan constitutional referendum =

Eleven constitutional amendments in American Samoa were up for election on November 8, 2022, as part of the 2022 United States elections. The proposed amendments were the result of the 129-member 6th Constitutional Convention held from August 29, to September 2, 2022. A simple majority and the approval of the U.S. Secretary of the Interior are required for an amendment to pass.

== Summary ==
Amendment	Description (result of a "yes" vote)	Yes Ioe	No Leai
Amendment 1	Have the Governor (instead of the U.S. Secretary of the Interior) appoint the chief justice and associate justice of the High Court, subject to legislative confirmation.	2,300; 33.65%	4,536; 66.35%
Amendment 2	Prohibit the U.S. Secretary of the Interior from being able to override the decisions of the High Court.	2,743; 40.05%	4,106; 59.95%
Amendment 3	Prohibit the U.S. Secretary of the Interior from being able to change the legislature's override of the governor's veto.	2,573; 37.84%	4,227; 62.16%
Amendment 4	Increase the size of the House of Representatives from twenty to twenty-two.	3,338; 49.47%	3,409; 50.53%
Amendment 5	Include Malaeimi in Itūʻau's territorial House district.	3,216; 47.30%	3,583; 52.70%
Amendment 6	Gives the non-voting delegate from Swains Island a right to vote in the House of Representatives.	3,893; 57.31%	3,008; 43.59%
Amendment 7	Adds two Senate seats for Manu’a, increasing the size of the Senate from eighteen to twenty.	2,593; 37.62%	4,299; 62.38%
Amendment 8	Give the legislature the power to impeach the governor and lieutenant governor.	4,094; 60.59%	2,663; 39.41%
Amendment 9	Change the territorial government's name from the "Government of American Samoa" to the "American Samoa Government".	3,926; 57.86%	2,859; 42.14%
Amendment 10	Change the name of the district "Ma'uputasi" to "Ma'oputasi".	3,932; 58.14%	2,831; 41.86%
Amendment 11	Change the name of the district "Leasina" to "Leasina ma Aitulagi".	3,797; 55.68%	3,022; 44.32%
Sources: Ballotpedia, American Samoa Government Election Office
