= Togafau =

Togafau is a surname. Notable people with the surname include:

- Gaoteote Palaie Tofau (fl. 1998), American Samoan politician
- Malaetasi Togafau (1946–2007), Attorney General of American Samoa
- Pago Togafau (born 1984), American football player
