= Maiava =

Maiava is a surname. Notable people with the surname include:

- Avagafono Tuavao Vaimaga Maiava, American Samoan politician
- Hutch Maiava (born 1976), New Zealand-born Samoan rugby league footballer
- Jayden Maiava (born 2004), American football player
- Kaluka Maiava (born 1986), American football player
- Neff Maiava (1924–2018), American Samoan professional wrestler
