= Leaeno Reed =

American politician

President of the Senate
- In office 1971–1972

Member of the Senate
- In office 1962–1973

Member of the House of Representatives
- In office 1958–1962

Personal details
- Born: 8 July 1918
- Died: 5 February 1974 (aged 55) Faga'alu, American Samoa

Leaeno T. W. Reed (8 July 1918 – 5 February 1974) was an American Samoan chief and politician. He served as a member of both the House of Representatives and the Senate, as well as becoming President of the Senate.

== Biography ==
Reed was a traditional chief, holding the titles High Chief and High Talking Chief. During World War II he served in the American army.

He was elected to the House of Representatives in 1958, serving two terms before being elected to the Senate in 1962. He was a member to the 1967 Constitutional Convention, and later served as President of the Senate.

Reed died at the LBJ Tropical Medical Center in February 1974 at the age of 55. He was survived by his wife and one child.
