= Tautoloitua Sauasetoa Ho Ching =

American Samoan politician

Member of the American Samoa House of Representatives from the 12th district
- Incumbent
- Assumed office January 3, 2023
- Preceded by: Logoituau Mark Atafua

Personal details
- Party: Republican

Tautoloitua Sauasetoa Ho Ching is an American Samoan politician who has served as a member of the American Samoa House of Representatives since 3 January 2023. He represents the 12th district.

== Electoral history ==
He was elected on November 3, 2020, in the 2020 American Samoan general election. He assumed office on 3 January 2021.

Political offices
Preceded by Logoituau Mark Atafua	Member of the American Samoa House of Representatives; 2022–present	Succeeded by incumbent
