= Matuʻu, American Samoa =

Matuʻu
- Village
- Etymology: Samoan: matuʻu ("heron" or "reef heron")
- Nickname: Yellow Town
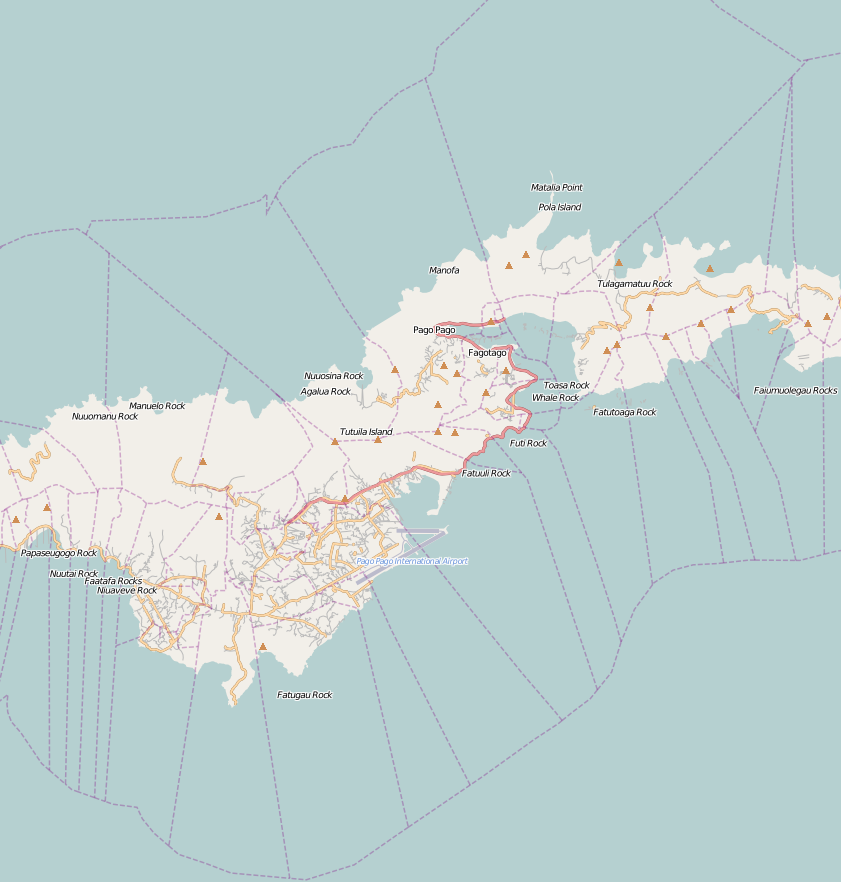
- Location within central American Samoa Location within American Samoa
- Coordinates: 14.299°S 170.684°W
- Country: United States
- Territory: American Samoa
- Island: Tutuila
- District: Eastern
- County: Itūʻau

Area
  - Total: 1.23 km^{2} (0.47 sq mi)

Population (2020)
  - Total: 317
  - Density: 258/km^{2} (668/sq mi)
- Time zone: UTC−11 (Samoa Time Zone)
- ZIP code: 96799
- Area code: +1 684
- Climate: Af
- GNIS feature ID: 2414236

Matuʻu, meaning heron or reef heron in Samoan, is a village located in the Eastern District of American Samoa, approximately 3.5 kilometers (2.2 miles) northeast of the capital, Pago Pago. Nicknamed "Yellow Town," Matuʻu is renowned for its unique tradition of adorning the entire village with soft yellow lights during the Christmas season.

== Etymology ==
The etymology for the name of the village, Matuʻu, is derived from the Samoan language and translates into English as "heron" or "reef heron" (Egretta sacra).

== Demographics ==
As of the 2020 United States census, the village of Matuʻu had a population of 317, reflecting a decrease from the 399 residents recorded in the 2010 census. The village spans an area of 1.23 square kilometers, giving it a population density of approximately 257.7 people per square kilometer in 2020. Over the course of a decade (2010–2020), Matuʻu experienced a population decline of 2.27% annually.

Looking at historical population trends, the village's population fluctuated over several decades. In the 1980 census, the village had 239 residents, which increased significantly by the 1990 census to 364 people. The population continued to rise in the early 2000s, reaching 385 by the 2000 census. However, since then, the population has seen a gradual decline, with the 2020 census reporting a notable drop compared to previous decades.

== Culture ==
Matuʻu is well known for its tradition of adorning the entire village with soft yellow lights during the Christmas season, giving it the nickname "Yellow Town". The village also contains the Matu’u & Faganeanea Marine Sanctuary, a haven for marine biodiversity and a site for the palolo worm harvest, an annual Samoan tradition.

== Notable people ==
- Uinifareti Rapi Sotoa, designer of the Flag of American Samoa.
