= Malaeoletalu Melesio Gurr =

American Samoan politician

Member of the American Samoa House of Representatives from the 8th district
- Incumbent
- Assumed office January 3, 2023
- Preceded by: Vailiuama Steve Leasiolagi

Malaeoletalu Melesio Gurr is an American Samoan politician who has served as a member of the American Samoa House of Representatives since 3 January 2023. He was elected on November 8, 2022, in the 2022 American Samoan general election and represents the 8th district.

Political offices
Preceded by Vailiuama Steve Leasiolagi	Member of the American Samoa House of Representatives; 2023–present	Succeeded by incumbent
