= UT1 (disambiguation) =

UT1 is the principal form of Universal Time.

UT1 may also refer to:

- Ultra Trencher 1, a submersible robot
- Toulouse Capitole University, formerly Université Toulouse 1, France
- UT1, one of the four Unit Telescopes making up the Very Large Telescope

UT-1 may refer to:

- Cadet UT-1, an American high-wing prototype glider
- Pershyi, formerly UT-1, a Ukrainian public television channel
- Utah's 1st congressional district
- Yakovlev UT-1 a training aircraft built in the Soviet Union
- UT-A1, or UT-1, a Urea Transporter

== See also ==
- UT (disambiguation)
- UTI (disambiguation)
