= Ben Vaomu Sauvao =

American Samoan politician

Member of the American Samoa House of Representatives from the 15th district
- Incumbent
- Assumed office January 3, 2025
- Preceded by: Samuel Ioka Ale Meleisea

Personal details
- Party: Nonpartisan

Ben Vaomu Sauvao is an American Samoan politician. He has served in the American Samoa House of Representatives since 2025.
