= Vala Liusamoa =

American Samoan politician

Member of the American Samoa House of Representatives from the 1st district
- Incumbent
- Assumed office January 3, 2025
- Preceded by: Faauifono Vaitautolu

Personal details
- Party: Nonpartisan

Vala Liusamoa is an American Samoan politician. He has served in the American Samoa House of Representatives since 2025.
