= Nuanuaolefeagaiga Saoluaga T. Nua =

American Samoan politician

Nua Saoluaga

Speaker of the American Samoa House of Representatives
- In office January 1997 – January 2001
- Preceded by: Savali Talavou Ale
- Succeeded by: Matagi Mailo McMoore

Member of the American Samoa Senate from the Manu'a 1st district
- In office 3 January 2013 – 3 January 2021
- Preceded by: Letalu Maui
- Succeeded by: Ma'o Faauma Gogo

Member of the American Samoa House of Representatives
- In office 2005–2006; 1985–2002; 1980–1984

Personal details
- Born: May 30, 1948 (age 78) Taʻū, American Samoa
- Party: Republican
- Education: MiraCosta College (AA); California State University, Long Beach (BS)

Nua Mailo Saoluaga (born May 30, 1948) is an American Samoan politician. He served as the Speaker of the American Samoa House of Representatives from 1997 until 2002, and as a Senator from 2013 to 2021.

Nua was a candidate for Lieutenant Governor of American Samoa in the 2008 gubernatorial elections, the running mate of Utu Abe Malae. Nua was a candidate for governor in the 2020 American Samoa gubernatorial election.

== Early life and education ==
Nua was born and on the island of Taʻū. He attended elementary school and high school in American Samoa.

He first received an Associate of Arts degree from MiraCosta College in Oceanside, California, in 1971. Nua further continued his education, obtaining his Bachelor of Science degree in criminology and law enforcement in 1974 from California State University, Long Beach.

== Career ==
Nua worked in several American Samoan government departments and agencies between 1975 and 1980.

=== Political career ===
Nua was first elected to the American Samoa House of Representatives in 1981. He would be elected to represent Manu'a District Number One in the House for much of the next two decades. He briefly left the House, but was re-elected again in 1985 and served continuously until 2002. Saoluaga served as the Speaker of the House from 1997 until 2001 during his tenure in office. He left office in 2001, but returned again to the American Samoa Fono from 2005 until 2006.

=== 2008 Lt. Governor candidacy ===
Utu Abe Malae, the former head of the Development Bank of American Samoa and gubernatorial candidate, chose Saoluaga as his running mate for lieutenant governor in the 2008 election for Governor of American Samoa. Malae and Saoluaga formally announced their candidacy for governor and lt. governor at the Maliu Mai Beach Resort on June 10, 2008. Malae cited Saoluaga's legislative career, which complimented his management experience, as the reason that the two decided to run as a team.

Malae and Nua cited education and healthcare as their top priorities in their campaign. Malae and Saoluaga lost to Governor Tulafono in a gubernatorial runoff election held on November 18, 2008.

=== American Samoa Senate ===
Nua was elected to the American Samoa Senate in 2012, representing the first Manuʻa District. He was re-elected in 2016. His re-election was subsequently challenged by local chiefs. The challenge was rejected in June 2017.

=== 2020 gubernatorial election ===
In January 2019, Nua announced his candidacy for Governor of American Samoa. Nua's running mate is Tapumanaia Galu Satele Jr., an educator and former member of the American Samoa House of Representatives.

Political offices
Preceded by Savali Talavou Ale	Speaker of the American Samoa House of Representatives; 1997–2001	Succeeded by Matagi Mailo McMoore
Party political offices
Preceded by Tuika Tuika	Republican nominee for Governor of American Samoa; 2020	Succeeded by Pula Nikolao Pula
