= Tiaoalii Fauagiga Sai =

American Samoan politician

Member of the American Samoa House of Representatives from the 2nd district
- Incumbent
- Assumed office January 3, 2021
- Preceded by: Toeaina Faufano Autele

Tiaoalii Fauagiga Sai is an American Samoan politician who has served as a member of the American Samoa House of Representatives since 3 January 2021. He represents the 2nd district.

== Electoral history ==
He was elected on November 3, 2020, in the 2020 American Samoan general election. He assumed office on 3 January 2021. He was reelected in the 2022 American Samoan general election.

Political offices
Preceded by Toeaina Faufano Autele	Member of the American Samoa House of Representatives; 2021–present	Succeeded by incumbent
