= Manumaua Wayne C. Wilson =

American Samoan politician

Member of the American Samoa House of Representatives from the 12th district
- Incumbent
- Assumed office January 3, 2015

Manumaua Wayne C. Wilson is an American Samoan politician who has served as a member of the American Samoa House of Representatives since 3 January 2023. He represents the 12th district, which includes Itūʻau County.

He was elected on November 3, 2020, in the 2020 American Samoan general election. He assumed office on 3 January 2021. On May 11, 2023, Governor Lemanu P. S Mauga appointed Wilson to the Development Bank of American Samoa's Board of Directors on an interim basis.

Political offices
| Preceded by | Member of the American Samoa House of Representatives; 2022–present | Succeeded by incumbent |
