= Rapi Sotoa =

American Samoan politician (d. 1970)

President of the Senate
- In office 1958–1968
- Constituency: Ta'u County

Personal details
- Born: September 26, 1903 Tula, American Samoa
- Died: 2 February 1970 (aged 66) Tutuila, American Samoa

Rapi Sotoa (died 2 February 1970) was an American Samoan chief and politician. He served as President of the Senate between 1958 and 1968.

== Biography ==
A high chief, Sotoa became chairman of the Council of Paramount Chiefs. Prior to entering politics he was a civil servant, starting work as a sanitation inspector in 1949.

In 1958 he became President of the Senate, holding the post for ten years. As a Senator he was a member of the Constitutional Convention of 1960 and one of the signatories of the constitution. In 1968 he became an assistant to the Governor.

He died on 2 February 1970 in Tutuila.
