= Ape Mike Asifoa =

American Samoan politician

Ape Mike

Member of the American Samoa House of Representatives from the 17th district
- Incumbent
- Assumed office January 3, 2021
- Preceded by: Gafatasi Afalava

Ape Mike Asifoa is an American Samoan politician who has served as a member of the American Samoa House of Representatives since 3 January 2021. He represents the 17th district, which includes Aitulagi and Leasina.

== Electoral history ==
He was elected on November 3, 2020, in the 2020 American Samoan general election. He won against incumbent Gafatasi Afalava, earning 255 votes against Afalava's 186. He assumed office on 3 January 2021 for his first term.

Political offices
Preceded by Gafatasi Afalava	Member of the American Samoa House of Representatives; 2021–present	Succeeded by incumbent
