= Faiivae Iuli Alex Godinet =

American Samoan politician and sports executive

Member of the American Samoa Senate from the 11th district
- Incumbent
- Assumed office January 2017

Personal details
- Born: Leone, American Samoa, U.S.
- Education: Los Angeles Harbor College (AA); California State University, Dominguez Hills (BA)

Faiivae Iuli A. Godinet is an American Samoan politician and sports executive serving as a member of the American Samoa Senate and president of the Football Federation American Samoa. In 2020, Godinet announced his bid for Lieutenant Governor of American Samoa as the running mate of Senate president, Gaoteote Palaie Tofau.

== Early life and education ==
Godinet was born and raised in Leone, American Samoa, the ninth of 16 children. Godinet earned an Associate degree from Los Angeles Harbor College, and bachelor's degree from California State University, Dominguez Hills. Godinet returned to American Samoa after graduation.

== Career ==
Godinet has served as the president of Football Federation American Samoa since 2007. He also served as vice president of the Oceania Football Confederation. After serving in several local government positions, Godinet served as Chief of Staff for Eni Faleomavaega during his time as a Delegate to the United States House of Representatives. Godinet was also a member of the American Samoa Telecommunications Authority. In 2017, Godinet was elected to serve as a member of the American Samoa Senate for the 11th district.

In 2020, Godinet was selected as the running mate of Senate president, Gaoteote Palaie Tofau, in the 2020 American Samoa gubernatorial election.
