= Faauifono Vaitautolu =

American Samoan politician

Member of the American Samoa House of Representatives from the 1st district
- Incumbent
- Assumed office September 20, 2023
- Preceded by: Alumamalu Ale Filoialii
- Succeeded by: Vala Liusamoa

Faauifono Vaitautolu is an American Samoan politician who has served as a member of the American Samoa House of Representatives since September 20, 2023. She represents the 1st district.

== Electoral history ==
She was elected on September 12, 2023, in a special election following the death of her predecessor. She assumed office on September 20, 2023, becoming the first woman to hold the district. She has also served as deputy director of education of American Samoa.

Political offices
Preceded by Alumamalu Ale Filoialii	Member of the American Samoa House of Representatives; 2023–present	Succeeded by incumbent
