= Vailoata Eteuati Amituanaʻi =

American Samoan politician

Vailoata Eteuati Amituana'i

Member of the American Samoa House of Representatives from the 7th district
- Incumbent
- Assumed office January 3, 2023

Vailoata Eteuati Amituanaʻie is an American Samoan politician who has served as a member of the American Samoa House of Representatives since 3 January 2021. He represents the 7th district. His father, Amituana’i Eteuati Sr., was also a member of Fono in the Senate.

== Electoral history ==
He was elected on November 3, 2020, in the 2020 American Samoan general election. He assumed office on 3 January 2021. He was reelected to a second term in the 2022 American Samoan general election.

Political offices
Preceded by	Member of the American Samoa House of Representatives; 2021–present	Succeeded by incumbent
