= Tuanaitau F. Tuia =

American Samoan politician

Tuanaitau Fa'atamala Tuia (c. 1920 – January 22, 2010) was an American Samoan politician and the longest-serving member of the American Samoan territorial legislature, the Fono, in history. Tuia served a combined 49 years in the Fono, including thirty years in the American Samoa House of Representatives and seventeen years in the Senate.

Tuia was heavily involved in all major political changes and debates in American Samoa between 1961 and 2010. He was in office more than a decade before the current American Samoa Fono building, completed in 1973, was constructed. Following Tuia's death in 2010, the longest-serving member of the Fono is currently House Speaker Savali Talavou Ale.

== Biography ==
=== Personal life ===
Tuia was from the village of Pava'ia'i. He was widely known by the name "Tua." Tuia married his wife, Betty, in Hawaii in 1946. The couple, who had six children, remained together until his wife's death in 2005.

Tuia served as a sa'o in his village. He worked as a legal practitioner, specializing in cases relating to titles and land. He was also a businessman within American Samoa's construction industry in addition to his political career.

=== American Samoa House of Representatives ===
Tuia's career in politics began in the November 1960 legislative election, when he was elected to the American Samoa House of Representatives representing Tualauta County in Western District. At the time of his election to the House, Tuia's matai name, meaning family or chiefly title, was Muagututi’a.

Tuia, though virtually unknown in political circles, was elected as the Speaker of the House in 1961, on his first day in office as an elected representative. His election as Speaker surprised many observers, as Tuia, a political newcomer and first-term representative, knew few people outside Tualauta County. The book, Fono Jubilee, which was published in 1998 and edited by Senator Fofo I.F. Sunia, described the surprise at Tuia's selection as Speaker, "Few people ever heard of him which is why his election as Speaker came as a shock." Tuia later served as Speaker on during several legislative sessions from 1967 to 1968; 1978–1984; and 1987–1992.

Tuia spent 30 years in the American Samoa House of Representatives, including 18 years as the Speaker of the House. He chose not to seek re-election in 1992 to pursue a successful campaign for the American Samoan Senate.

=== American Samoa Senate ===
He was elected to the American Samoa Senate for Tualauta County in 1992. His first term as Senator began in 1993 and he remained in that office until his death in 2010.

Tuia was taken to Lyndon B. Johnson Tropical Medical Center and placed in the intensive-care unit on January 21, 2010. He died at the hospital in Faga'alu on January 22, 2010, at the age of 89. He was survived by six children; grandchildren, including current Rep. Galu Satele Jr.; and great-grandchildren.

A state funeral for Tuia was held at the Fono Guest Fale. Dignitaries in attendance included Governor Togiola Tulafono, House Speaker Savali Talavou Ale, Senate President Gaoteote Tofau Palaie, Chief Justice Michael Kruse, as well as traditional American Samoan leaders.

Tuia's funeral was held at the Church of Jesus Christ of Latter-day Saints in his home village of Pavaiai. He was buried at his home in Pavaiai.
