= List of American Samoa Fono =

List of American Samoa legislative terms

The following is a list of terms of the American Samoa Fono, the legislature of American Samoa. The legislature operates under the amended 1960 Constitution of American Samoa.

== Legislatures ==
- 1st American Samoa Fono, 1948
- 8th American Samoa Fono, ca.1963
- 11th American Samoa Fono, ca.1971
- 16th American Samoa Fono, ca.1979
- 30th American Samoa Fono, January 8, 2007-ca.2008
- 37th American Samoa Fono, ca.2021-ca.2022
- 38th American Samoa Fono, July 8, 2024 – present

== See also ==
- List of speakers of the American Samoa House of Representatives
- List of presidents of the American Samoa Senate
- List of governors of American Samoa
- Lists of United States state legislative sessions
