= Gaoteote Palaie Tofau =

American Samoan politician

President of the American Samoa Senate
- In office January 2009 – January 8, 2021
- Preceded by: Lutu Moli
- Succeeded by: Tuaolo Fruean

Member of the American Samoa Senate from the 4th district
- Incumbent
- Assumed office January 2004

Member of the American Samoa House of Representatives
- In office 1998–2002

Personal details
- Children: 4
- Education: University of Hawaii, Manoa

Military service
- Allegiance: United States
- Branch/service: United States Army
- Rank: Command Sergeant Major

Gaoteote Palaie Tofau is an American Samoan politician serving as a member and president of the American Samoa Senate. Tofau first took office in January 2004 after serving as a member of the American Samoa House of Representatives.

== Early life ==
Tofau was raised in Vatia, American Samoa. His father served as a member of the American Samoa Senate. After graduating from high school, Tofau attended University of Hawaiʻi at Mānoa on a full scholarship sponsored by the Government of American Samoa.

== Career ==
Tofau served as a career member of the United States Army, retiring after 22 years as a Command Sergeant Major. Tofau eventually returned to American Samoa to care for his father. He worked at Tafuna High School in the ROTC program. In 1998, he was elected to the American Samoa House of Representatives, serving until 2002. From 2002 to 2004, he served as a special assistant to the Commissioner of Public Safety. In 2005, Tofau was elected to the American Samoa Senate. He was selected to serve as president of the senate in 2009.

In February 2020, Tofau announced his candidacy for governor in the 2020 American Samoa gubernatorial election. Tofau's running mate will be Faiivae Iuli Alex Godinet, a fellow member of the American Samoa Senate and president of the Football Federation American Samoa.

== Personal life ==
Tofau has four children, 15 grandchildren, and 8 great grandchildren. He is a member of the Congregational Christian Church in American Samoa. One of Tofau's grandsons, Palaie Gaoteote IV, is an NCAA Division I college football player for the USC Trojans.

Political offices
Preceded by Lutu Moli	President of the American Samoa Senate; 2009–2021	Succeeded by Tuaolo Manaia Fruean
