= Saena Omar Shalhout =

American politician

Member-elect of the American Samoa House of Representatives from the 10th district
- Assuming office January 2027
- Succeeding: Tapai Alailepule Benjamin Vaivao

Personal details
- Party: Nonpartisan

Saena Omar Shalhout is an American politician. He is the member-elect for the 10th district of the American Samoa House of Representatives.
