= Ma'o Faauma Gogo =

American Samoan politician

Member of the American Samoa Senate from the 1st district
- Incumbent
- Assumed office January 3, 2021
- Preceded by: Nuanuaolefeagaiga Saoluaga T. Nua

Personal details
- Political party: Nonpartisan

Ma'o Faauma Gogo is an American Samoan politician. He serves as a member for the 1st district of the American Samoa Senate.
