= Andra Samoa =

American Samoan chief executive and environmentalist

Member of the American Samoa House of Representatives from the 13th district
- In office 2019–2023
- Preceded by: Fagaotua Dorian Salave’a
- Succeeded by: Fiu Saelua

Personal details
- Occupation: Environmentalist, community organizer

Andra Theresa Samoa is an American Samoan chief executive and environmentalist. She is also involved as a community organizer in Leone and works on several projects to restore coastal environmental areas. She was one of two women serving in the American Samoa Fono in 2019. She lost reelection in 2022.

== Early life ==
Andra Theresa Samoa grew up in Leone, Tutuila, American Samoa.

== Career ==
She was the chief executive officer of the American Samoa Power Authority (ASPA) from 2006 to 2013 and led the installation of the country's first solar powered electrical grid. She also managed the country's gas supply and distribution following the withdrawal of ExxonMobil. Samoa has also been chief executive officer of the Pacific eCommerce Development Corporation, which works on various information technology projects.

Samoa has worked in a voluntary capacity for a number of environmental conservation projects, including a local government programme in Leone to encourage the regrowth of coral using indigenous methods. She is also involved in restoring the mangrove swamps and coastal wetlands. In addition, she has organised skills training for villagers in Leone that has been replicated elsewhere in American Samoa. In 2013, she was on hand to accept the donation of plants to the Leone Healing Garden Project with the Leone Empowerment Team. She has also been involved in efforts to help spay and neuter cats and dogs in Leone.

In 2017, she was profiled as one of "70 Inspiring Pacific Women," and had been nominated for the award by individuals at the University of Hawaii, Manoa.
