= Lynn Pulou-Alaimalo =

American Samoan writer

- Alma mater: University of Phoenix
- Occupation: Writer

Lynn Pulou-Alaimalo is a writer from American Samoa. Her first book was nominated for the Writer’s Digest Annual Awards

== Life ==
Pulou-Alaimalo was born in Lauli’i village, American Samoa one of twelve children of Leaana Tavita and Nuuuli Pulou. She attended Faasao Marist High School. She studied literature and English at the Harold Washington College, Chicago while living in Macedonia. She also studied human services, and psychology and received her Bachelor of Science in Human Service at the University of Phoenix, graduating in 2014, followed by a Master's degree in Public Administration, also from the University of Phoenix in 2015. She pursued a Juris Doctor at Concord Law School in 2016.

She served in the United States Army as a Small Arms and Towed Artillery Repairer. She is an educator, lobbyist, advocate, writer, counselor, publisher and a true statement of a young, productive leader who fathoms the value of hardwork and setting an example for the growing generations of the Samoan islands. Upon completing two tours in support of the Operation Iraqi Freedom and one peacekeeping operation in Kosovo, Lynn continued serving under local and state districts as an educator. Lynn taught in the district schools in the State of Washington and was the first Samoan female educator in Tomah, Wisconsin.

Pulou-Alaimalo's first book was nominated for the Writer’s Digest Annual Awards. Her writing focuses on Samoan family life and the family values of the characters.

On February 18, 2021, Lynn Pulou-Alaimalo was confirmed by the American Samoa House of Representatives as the American Samoa Government’s Human Resources Director.

== Publications ==
- Lovefolds of Our Upbringing: A Family's Journey in Life (2015)
- Pintail Foundation: Aiga (2016)
