= Hannibal Vaivao =

American rugby union player (born 1987)

Personal information
- Full name: Hannibal Vaivao
- Born: March 21, 1987 (age 38) Long Beach, California, United States
- Height: 188 cm (6 ft 2 in)
- Weight: 120 kg (18 st 13 lb)

Playing information
- Position: Prop
Club
Years	Team	Pld	T	G	FG	P
2011	Washington DC Slayers
2010	Northern Virginia Eagles
	Total	0	0	0	0	0

Hannibal Vaivao is an American rugby union player for Old Glory DC of Major League Rugby. His position is at prop.

Vaivao was a former rugby league footballer prop for the Washington DC Slayers and Northern Virginia Eagles in the USA Rugby League.

He also played American football for the Southeast Missouri State Redhawks and PAC in rugby union.
