= 2014 American Samoan constitutional referendum =

- 4 November 2014
- Should Article II, Sections 9 and 19 of the revised constitution of American Samoa be revised to give the Fono, rather than the Secretary for the U.S. Department of Interior, the power to override the Governor's veto?

Results
Choice	Votes	%
Yes	2,670	26.19%
No	7,526	73.81%

A constitutional referendum was held in American Samoa on 4 November 2014. The proposed amendment to the constitution would have allowed the Fono to override vetoes by the Governor.

== Background ==
The proposal amendment to the constitution would have allowed the Fono to override vetoes issued by the Governor by a two-thirds majority vote in cases where the Governor rejected legislation that had been passed twice by the Fono. It was approved by the Senate on 18 February 2014, and was supported by Governor Lolo Letalu Matalasi Moliga. As it involved amending the constitution, the proposal would have also needed approval from the United States Congress.

== Results ==
Choice	Votes	%
For	2,670	26.19
Against	7,526	73.81
Total	10,196	100.00
Registered voters/turnout	16,776	–
Source: Elections Office
