= Vaas =

Vaas may refer to:

Places

- Vaas, Sarthe, a town in western France

People

- Chaminda Vaas (born 1974), Sri Lankan cricketer
- Peter Vaas (born 1952), American football player and coach
- Vincent Vaas (1922–2004), Sri Lankan actor

Fictional characters

- Vaas Montenegro, the secondary antagonist from the 2012 video game Far Cry 3
