= Faimealelei Anthony Fuʻe Allen =

American Samoan politician

Member of the American Samoa House of Representatives from the 11th district
- Incumbent
- Assumed office January 3, 2021

Faimealelei Anthony Fuʻe Allen is an American Samoan politician who has served as a member of the American Samoa House of Representatives since 3 January 2023. He represents the 11th district, which includes Aua.

== Electoral history ==
He was elected on November 3, 2020, in the 2020 American Samoan general election against Muaiavaona Fofoga Pila. He assumed office on 3 January 2021.

== Controversies ==
Allen was seen leaving a quarantine zone by a witness, but denied it. He also suggested having government officials vaccinated before other groups, such as the elderly.

Political offices
| Preceded by | Member of the American Samoa House of Representatives; 2022–present | Succeeded by incumbent |
