= Letuli Toloa =

American Samoa paramount chief

Letuli Toloa was an American Samoa paramount chief and the longest-serving President of the American Samoa Senate (at the time of his death). From 1989 until his death on January 30, 1996, Paramount Chief Punefu-ole-motu Letuli Toloa served as Senate President.

== Personal life ==
Toloa received the chiefly title “Letuli” while serving for the U.S. Coast Guard in Pago Pago. Letuli Toloa died on January 30, 1996, during his sixth term as Senate President. He was survived by his wife, Saolotoga Savali Letuli, and their six children and ten grandchildren.

== Career ==
Toloa served over twenty years in the U.S. Coast Guard before serving as Governor for the Western District from 1974-1977. He also served as a Police Commissioner prior to entering the Senate. In 1978, he was appointed Commissioner of Public Safety for American Samoa. Three years later, in 1981, Chief Toloa became a Senator representing his district in the American Samoa Senate. In 1989, Letuli was elected as President of the American Samoa Senate.
