= Uti Petelo =

American Samoan politician

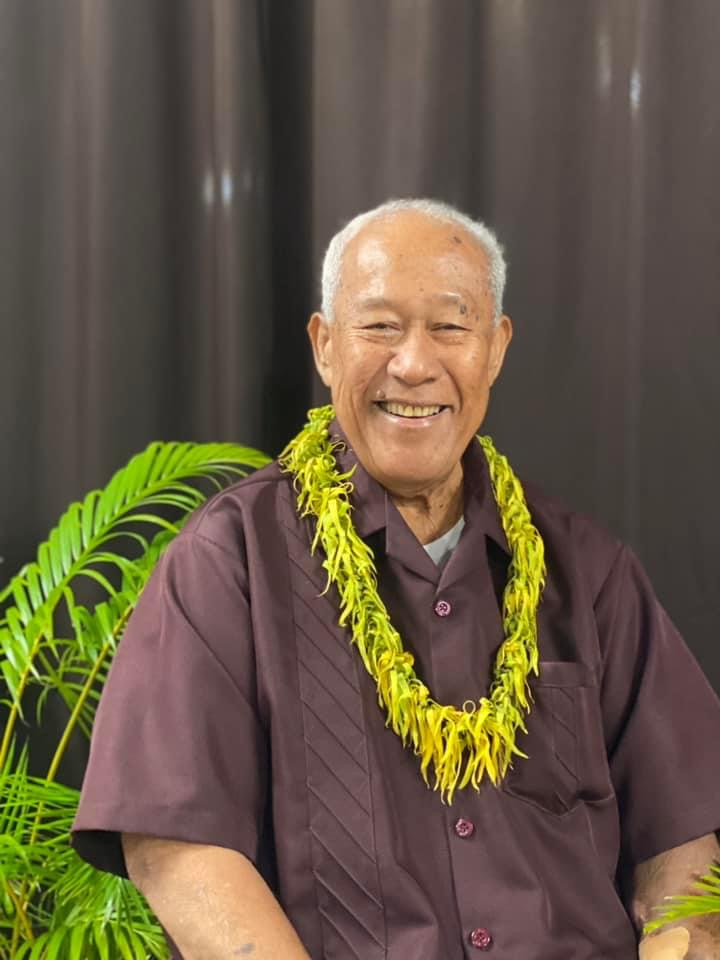

Member of the American Samoa Senate from the Maʻopūtasi County district
- Incumbent
- Assumed office 3 January 2020
- Preceded by: Tilo Vasaga Tilo

Member of the American Samoa Senate from the Maʻopūtasi County district
- Preceded by: Faumuina Tagisialii
- Succeeded by: Tilo Vasaga Tilo

Personal details
- Born: 1944 or 1945
- Died: January 11, 2026 Washington State

Uti Petelo Iuliano Sua (died 11 January 2026) is an American Samoan politician and member of the American Samoa Senate.

Petelo is from Leloaloa, American Samoa. He was elected to the Senate following the death of Faumuina Tagisialii. At the 2016 election chiefs were unable to reach a consensus on who should fill the seat, resulting in Tilo Vasaga Tilo being elected by lot. He was re-elected to the Senate at the 2020 election.
