= American Samoa Fono =

Territorial legislature of American Samoa

Coordinates: 14.2782°S 170.6890°W

Type
- Type: Bicameral
- Houses: Senate; House of Representatives

History
- Founded: October 26, 1948 (78 years ago)

Leadership
- Senate President: Tuaolo Fruean (I) since January 8, 2021
- House Speaker: Savali Talavou Ale (R) since January 4, 2007

Structure
- Seats: 39 voting members: 18 senators; 21 representatives
- Senate political groups: Non-partisan (18)
- House of Representatives political groups: Non-partisan (20); Swains Island delegate (1)

Elections
- Last Senate election: November 3, 2026
- Last House of Representatives election: November 3, 2026
- Next Senate election: November 7, 2028
- Next House of Representatives election: November 7, 2028

Website
- americansamoa.gov/fono

Constitution
- Constitution of American Samoa

The American Samoa Fono is the territorial legislature of American Samoa. Like most states and territorial legislatures of the United States, it is a bicameral legislature with a House of Representatives and a Senate. The legislature is located in Fagatogo along Pago Pago harbor.

It is the only legislature on the state or territorial level in the United States that is both bicameral and nonpartisan. The Nebraska Legislature is similarly nonpartisan yet is a unicameral body.

== History ==
American Samoa became a United States territory in 1900 and was initially administered by the Navy. The first governor, Commander B. F. Tilley, issued regulation no. 5 on May 1, 1900, called "A Declaration Concerning the Form of Government for the United States Naval Station, Tutuila", which declared that American laws were in force in the territory. From 1905, annual meetings were held with delegates sent from the local communities, as an advisory council to the naval governor, who retained the sole legislative power.

During Governor Vernon Huber's term in office, from 1947 to 1949, American Samoans moved towards greater self-government. In 1948, under Huber's encouragement, the legislature of the territory, known as the American Samoa Fono, convened for the first time. It was established as a bicameral legislature, still in advisory capacity. The upper house, named the House of Ali‘i, was composed of 12 members, being the seven high chiefs of Tutuila and the five high chiefs of Manu‘a. The lower house, named the House of Representatives, was composed of 54 members: 52 (one from each village) were elected in open meetings according to Samoan custom, and two were elected by secret ballot by residents not living under the matai system.

The legislature was reformed in 1952, after administration of American Samoa had been transferred to the Department of the Interior. Members of the House of Ali‘i became advisors to the governor, while a new upper house, named the Senate, was established. There were 15 senators, five from each of the three districts of American Samoa (Western, Eastern and Manu‘a). Senators were elected in open meetings according to Samoan custom and had to hold a matai title. The number of representatives was reduced to 18, all elected by secret ballot: five from each of the three districts, one from Swains Island, and two elected by residents not living under the matai system.

In 1960, the first constitution of American Samoa was adopted. The number of Fono members remained the same, but with a slightly different geographic distribution. The Senate had one member from each of the then 14 counties, elected for four-year terms, and an additional senator rotating from the then four counties of the Western District, elected for two-year terms. The House of Representatives had one member from each of three districts in Maʻopūtasi county, one from each of two districts in Lealataua/Fofo county, one from each of the then remaining 12 counties, and one non-voting delegate from Swains Island, all elected for two-year terms.

In 1967, the revised constitution modified both houses. The Senate was set to 18 members: two from the combined counties of Taʻū island; one from the combined counties of Ofu-Olosega; three from Ma‘oputasi county; two each from Suʻa, Itūʻau and Tuālāuta counties; and one from each of the six remaining counties. This same distribution was applied to the House of Representatives, except that Ma‘oputasi received five representatives, in addition to one non-voting delegate from Swains Island, for a total of 21 members.

In 2025, the delegate from Swains Island became a voting member of the House of Representatives, even though the island was uninhabited and only nine former inhabitants were eligible to select the delegate.

== Qualifications and elections ==
Senators must be U.S. nationals, be at least 30 years of age, have resided in American Samoa for at least five years, including one year immediately preceding the election, and must hold a matai title in the county that they will represent. They are elected according to Samoan custom by the county councils, for four-year terms.

Representatives (also called faipule) and the delegate from Swains Island must be U.S. nationals, be at least 25 years of age, have resided in American Samoa for at least five years, and resided in the district that they will represent for at least one year immediately preceding the election. They do not need to be matai, but usually are. Representatives are elected by secret ballot, while the delegate from Swains Island is elected in an open meeting, all for two-year terms. Voters must be U.S. nationals, be at least 18 years of age, have resided in American Samoa for at least two years, and resided in the same district for at least one year immediately preceding the election.

Elections are held in the first Tuesday after November 1 in even years, the same as federal and most state elections. Ballots contain only the names of the candidates, without political parties. First-past-the-post voting is used: each voter votes for up to the same number of candidates as the number of representatives to be elected in the district (one or two), and such number of candidates with the highest number of votes are elected. Ties are decided by lot.

== Districts ==
For the House of Representatives, each district consists of one or more whole counties, part of a county, or Swains Island. Each House district elects one or two members. For the Senate, each district consists of one or more whole counties, electing one, two or three members.

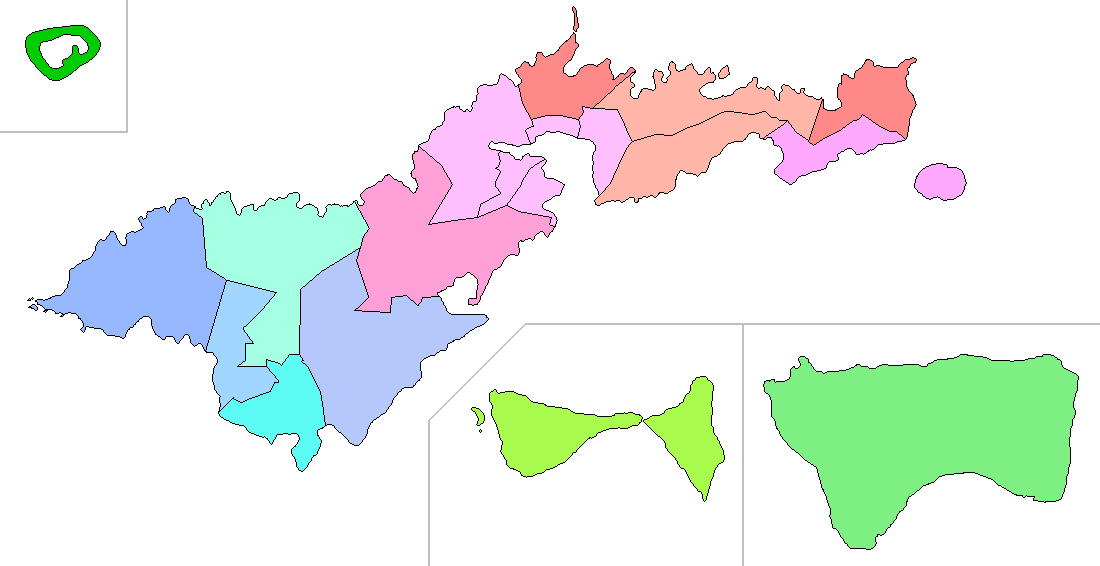
Districts of the American Samoa Fono

District	Members	
District	House	Senate
Taʻū, Faleasao, Fitiʻuta	2	2
Ofu, Olosega	1	1
Vaifanua	1	1
Saʻole	1	1
Suʻa 1 (Fagaʻitua, Amaua, Auto, Avaio, Alega, Aʻumi, Lauliʻi)	1	2
Suʻa 2 (Saʻilele, Masausi, Masefau, Afono)	1	2
Maʻopūtasi 1 (Fatumafuti, Fagaʻalu, Utulei)	1	3
Ma‘oputasi 2 (Fagatogo)	1	3
Ma‘oputasi 3 (Pago Pago)	1	3
Ma‘oputasi 4 (Satala, Atuʻu, Leloaloa)	1	3
Ma‘oputasi 5 (Aua)	1	3
Itūʻau	2	2
Fofo	1	1
Lealataua	1	1
Tuālāuta	2	2
Tualatai	1	1
Leasina	1	1
Swains Island	1	—

=== Reapportionment ===
The number of representatives and senators per district, set by the constitution in 1967, was roughly proportional to their population in the census of 1960, the most recent at the time. Although the constitution states that "Senators and representatives shall be reapportioned by law at intervals of not less than 5 years", such reapportionment has never been made. Therefore, as a result of population changes, the representation of some counties has become disproportional. The largest discrepancies occur in the counties of the Manu‘a islands, whose population has significantly decreased, and in Tuālāuta, whose population has increased much more than the rest of the territory. In 2017 and 2018, proposals were made to add one or two representatives from Tuālāuta, while possibly reducing one representative from Manu‘a. In 2022, a proposal to add one representative from Ituʻau and one from Tuālāuta was narrowly rejected by voters.

Proposals have also been made to restore two additional senators from Manu‘a, resulting in the five senators (one per county) that Manu‘a had before the constitutional revision of 1967. The Fono rejected such a proposal in 2017, and voters also rejected it in 2022.

== Building ==
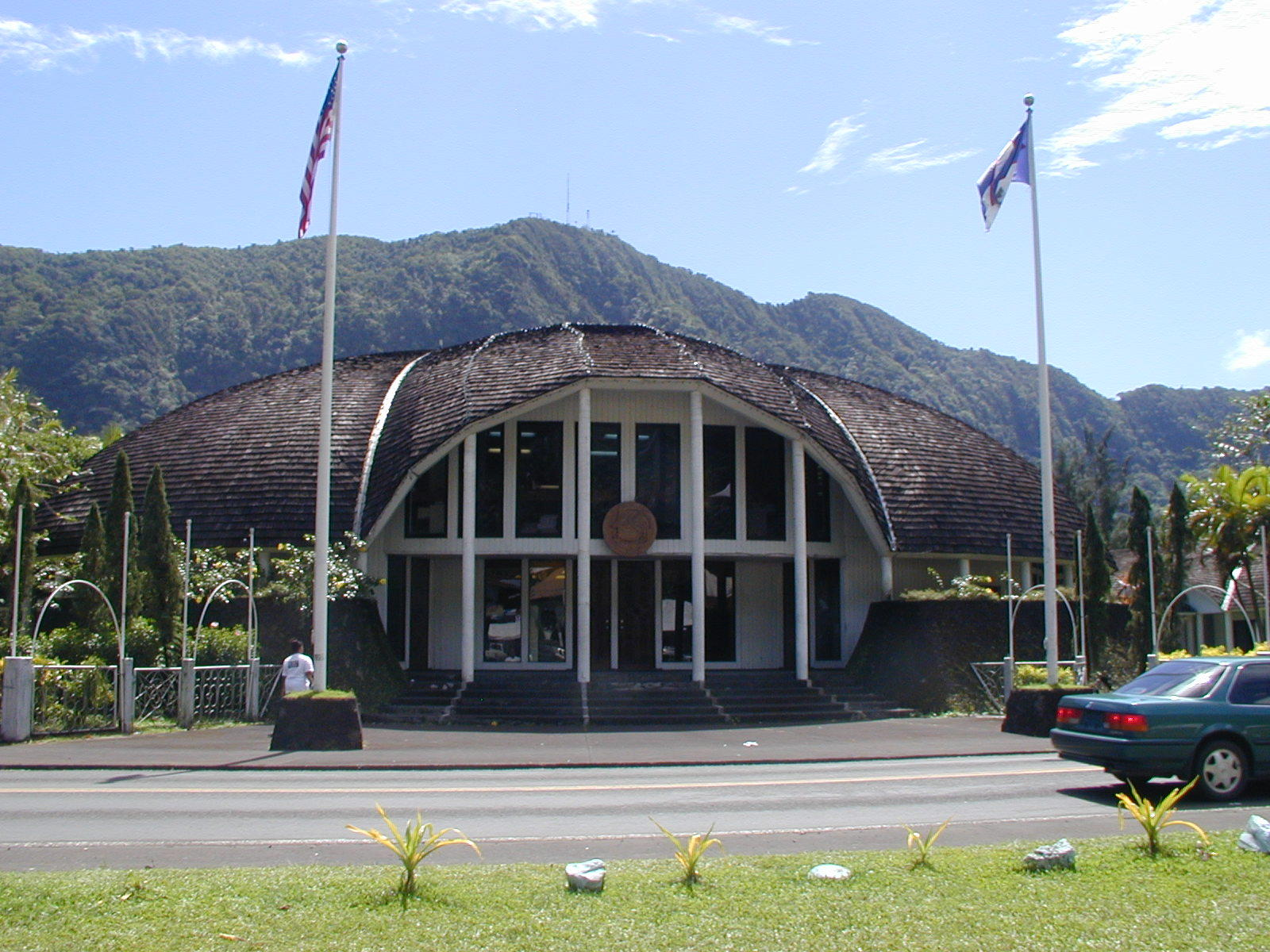
The second American Samoa Legislature Maota Fono building in Fagatogo

The first American Samoa Fono was housed in the former United States Navy Tutuila Station barracks in Fagatogo. It was destroyed by a fire in 1970. The former Fono site became home to the ANZ Amerika Samoa Bank's Head Office.

The second Fono opened in 1973, also in Fagatogo. It was housed at the Maota Fono complex, a beehive-shaped building based on the traditional Samoan fale. It was based on the same traditional building designs as the Fono in Samoa. A two-story main wing, housing the legislature's and governor's offices, was flanked by two single-story wings, housing the chambers of the Senate and the House of Representatives. The building was demolished in 2017.

The third Fono began construction in 2018 at the same location as a two-story cement building, with an estimated cost of US$16 million. It was inaugurated in 2025.

== See also ==
- List of American Samoa Fono
- List of state and territorial capitols in the United States
