= Avagafono Tuavao Vaimaga Maiava =

American Samoan politician

Member of the American Samoa House of Representatives from the 6th district
- Incumbent
- Assumed office January 3, 2021
- Preceded by: Loia Gutu

Avagafono Tuavao Vaimaga Maiava is an American Samoan politician who has served as a member of the American Samoa House of Representatives since 3 January 2021. He represents the 6th district.

== Electoral history ==
He was elected on November 3, 2020, in the 2020 American Samoan general election. He assumed office on 3 January 2021. He was reelected to the seat in the 2022 American Samoan general election.

Political offices
Preceded by Loia Gutu	Member of the American Samoa House of Representatives; 2021–present	Succeeded by incumbent
