= List of presidents of the American Samoa Senate =

The president of the American Samoa Senate is the presiding officer of that legislature.

== List of presidents ==
Name	Term
Rapi Sotoa	1958–1968
Salanoa S. P. Aumoeualogo	1969–1970
Leaeno Reed	1971–1972
Salanoa S. P. Aumoeualogo	1973–1978
Galea'i P. Poumele	1979–1985
Letuli Toloa	1985–1996
Lutu T. S. Fuimaono	1996–2004
Lolo Matalasi Moliga	2005–2008
Lutu M. Moli	2008–2009
Gaoteote Palaie Tofau	2009–2021
Tuaolo Manaia Fruean	2021–present

== See also ==
- List of American Samoa Fono

== Sources ==
- Sunia, Fofō I. F. (1998). The Story of the Legislature of American Samoa: In Commemoration of the Golden Jubilee 1948-1998. Pago Pago, AS: Legislature of American Samoa. ISBN 9789829008015
- Various editions of The Europa World Year Book
