= Shaun Onosa'i Vaa =

American Samoan politician

Member of the American Samoa House of Representatives from the 3rd district
- Incumbent
- Assumed office January 3, 2023
- Preceded by: Lavea Fatulegae’e Palepoi Mauga

Personal details
- Party: Republican

Shaun Onosa'i Vaa is an American Samoan politician who has served as a member of the American Samoa House of Representatives since 3 January 2023. He represents the 3rd district.

== Electoral history ==
He was elected on November 8, 2022, in the 2022 American Samoan general election. He assumed office on 3 January 2023.

Political offices
Preceded by Lavea Fatulegae’e Palepoi Mauga	Member of the American Samoa House of Representatives; 2023–present	Succeeded by incumbent
