= Fetu Fetui Jr. =

American Samoan politician

Member of the American Samoa House of Representatives from the 1st district
- Incumbent
- Assumed office January 3, 2023

Personal details
- Party: Republican

Fetu Fetui Jr. is an American Samoan politician who has served as a member of the American Samoa House of Representatives since 3 January 2021. In 2023, he became Vice Speaker of the House. He represents the 1st district.

== Electoral history ==
He was elected on November 3, 2020, in the 2020 American Samoan general election. He assumed office on 3 January 2021. He was reelected in the 2022 American Samoan general election.

Political offices
Preceded by	Member of the American Samoa House of Representatives; 2021–present	Succeeded by incumbent
