= Titialiʻi Kitara Vaiau =

American Samoan politician

Member of the American Samoa House of Representatives from the 4th district
- Incumbent
- Assumed office January 3, 2021

Titialiʻi Kitara Vaiau is an American Samoan politician who has served as a member of the American Samoa House of Representatives since 3 January 2021. He represents the 4th district.

== Electoral history ==
He was elected on November 3, 2020, in the 2020 American Samoan general election. He assumed office on 3 January 2021. He was reelected in the 2022 American Samoan general election. He lost re-election in 2024.

Political offices
Preceded by	Member of the American Samoa House of Representatives; 2021–present	Succeeded by incumbent
