= Trude Ledoux-Sunia =

American Samoan politician

Member of the American Samoa House of Representatives from the 9th district
- Incumbent
- Assumed office January 3, 2025
- Preceded by: Vesiai Poyer S. Samuelu

Personal details
- Party: Nonpartisan

Trude Ledoux-Sunia is an American Samoan politician. She has served in the American Samoa House of Representatives since 2025.
