= Manavaalofa Tutuila Manase =

American Samoan politician

Member of the American Samoa House of Representatives from the 16th district
- Incumbent
- Assumed office 2014
- Preceded by: Timusa Tini Lam Yuen

Manavaalofa Tutuila Manase is an American Samoan politician who has served as a member of the American Samoa House of Representatives since 3 January 2023. He represents the 16th district, which includes Tualatai County.

== Electoral history ==
Manase was first elected in 2014 in the 2014 American Samoan general election. He was reelected on November 3, 2020, in the 2020 American Samoan general election, with 357 votes against Rachael Manning Key with 75 votes and Timusa Tini Lam Yuen with 291 votes.

Political offices
Preceded by Timusa Tini Lam Yuen	Member of the American Samoa House of Representatives; 2014–present	Succeeded by incumbent
