= Fiu Saelua =

American Samoan politician

- Saelua in 2015

Member of the American Samoa House of Representatives from the 13th district
- Incumbent
- Assumed office January 3, 2023
- Preceded by: Andra Samoa

Personal details
- Party: Nonpartisan

Fiu Saelua is an American Samoan politician. He has served in the American Samoa House of Representatives since 2023.
