= Samuel Ioka Ale Meleisea =

American politician

Samuel Ioka Ale Meleisea (born March 1991) is a politician and member of the American Samoa House of Representatives. He was elected to the House in 2016 and reelected in 2018, 2020, and 2022. He was defeated for reelection by Ben Vaomu Sauvao.

Prior to his election to the American Samoa House of Representatives, he was a Rainforest Bio Technician for the National Park of American Samoa. He is a graduate of the University of Hawaiʻi at Hilo with a Bachelor of Science in tropical plant science and agro-ecology.
