= Savali Talavou Ale =

American Samoan politician

Savali Ale
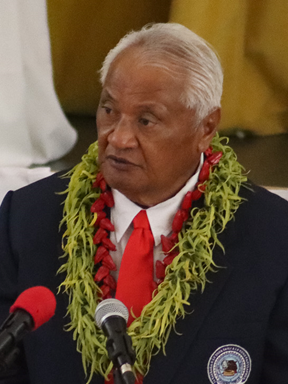
- Savali Talavou Ale speaking at the opening of the 38th Legislature

Speaker of the American Samoa House of Representatives
- Incumbent
- Assumed office January 4, 2007
- Preceded by: Matagi McMoore
- In office January 1993 – January 1997
- Preceded by: Tuanaitau F. Tuia
- Succeeded by: Nua Mailo Saoluaga

Personal details
- Born: September 5, 1952 (age 74) Fagaliʻi, American Samoa, U.S.
- Party: Republican
- Spouse: Sakala Mautofu Ale (1977–2015)
- Children: 11
- Education: Cannon College of Commerce (attended); California Baptist University (BS)

Savali Talavou Ale (born September 5, 1952) is an American Samoan politician. He has served as the Speaker of the American Samoa House of Representatives since 2007. Ale, who was first elected to the House of Representatives in 1981, is also the longest serving current member of the American Samoa House of Representatives, as of 2015.

He is originally from Fagaliʻi, American Samoa, but now resides in the village of ʻIliʻili. Ale married his wife, Sakala Mautofu Ale, July 16, 1977, at a ceremony in Carson, California. The couple had eleven biological children, as well as several other children the family had adopted and raised. Both Savali Talavou Ale and Sakala Mautofu Ale were ordained deacons in the Congregational Christian Church in American Samoa (CCCAS).

== Biography ==
=== Personal life ===
Ale's wife, Sakala Mautofu Ale (Poloa), died from a sudden illness on Saturday, September 5, 2015, at the age of 59. The couple had been married for 38 years. During his first term as Speaker of the American Samoa House of Representatives, the chiefly title "Savali" was bestowed upon him. He is a member of the Congregational Church.

=== Education and early career ===
After graduating from Leone High School, he attended the Cannon's College of Commerce and later received a Bachelor of Science in Business Administration from California Baptist College in 1977. He also took summer courses at both University of Oregon (1978) and at the University of Hawaiʻi (1979). He later moved back to American Samoa where he became a school teacher at Leone High School. He later worked for the Tax Office and as the supervisor of the payroll division at Van Camp Seafood Company.

=== Political career ===
Savali was first elected to the American Samoa House of Representatives in the 1981 elections and won re-election from the 1980s and through the 2010s. The Speaker of the House appointed him Chairman of the Budget and Appropriations Committee, a position which allowed Savali to utilize his knowledge of commerce. Another of his committee assignments was to work on the review of the American Samoa Constitution.

He was first elected to the House of Representatives in 1981. Ale, who has never lost re-election, has been re-elected to the House during each successive general election from the 1980s and 2010s, making him the House's longest-serving member, as of 2015.

On November 7, 2006, incumbent Speaker Matagi Mailo Ray McMoore lost re-election to the House of Representatives in the general election. Savali, who was Vice Speaker of the House from 2005 to 2007, was elected Speaker of the American Samoa House of Representatives in January 2007 after he received eleven more votes than his opponent, longtime Rep. Gaoteote Palie Tofau.

Savali was challenged by Ituau Rep. Taotasi Archie Soliai for the Speakership in 2010, but Savali won re-election as Speaker. Rep. Taotasi Archie Soliai once again challenged Savali for the position of Speaker of the 33rd legislature (2013–2015) in January 2013. Ale defeated Soliai with a vote of 13-7. Rep. Soliai was later defeated for re-election on November 4, 2014, in the general election.

He was unanimously re-elected Speaker of the House of Representatives for the 34th Legislature on January 3, 2015.

Political offices
Preceded by Tuanaitau F. Tuia	Speaker of the American Samoa House of Representatives; 1993–1997	Succeeded by Nua Mailo Saoluaga
Preceded by Matagi Mailo McMoore	Speaker of the American Samoa House of Representatives; 2007–present	Incumbent
