= Tapai Alailepule Benjamin Vaivao =

American Samoan politician

Member of the American Samoa House of Representatives from the 10th district
- Incumbent
- Assumed office January 3, 2023
- Preceded by: Vaetasi Tuumolimoli Moliga
- Succeeded by: Saena Omar Shalhout (elect)

Personal details
- Born: Leloaloa, American Samoa
- Education: bachelor's degree
- Alma mater: South University
- Profession: Customs officer

Tapai Alailepule Benjamin Vaivao is an American Samoan politician who has served as a member of the American Samoa House of Representatives since 3 January 2023. He represents the 10th district.

== Electoral history ==
He was elected on November 8, 2023, in the 2022 American Samoan general election. He assumed office on 3 January 2023.

== Biography ==
Vaivao was born in Leloaloa, American Samoa. He graduated from Samoana High School. He earned a bachelor's degree from South University in 2022.

Political offices
Preceded by Vaetasi Tuumolimoli Moliga	Member of the American Samoa House of Representatives; 2022–present	Succeeded by incumbent
