= Leloaloa, American Samoa =

Village in American Samoa

Leloaloa
- Village
- Etymology: "The long" in Samoan
- Interactive map of Leloaloa
- Location within American Samoa
- Coordinates: 14°16′1″S 170°40′43″W
- Country: United States
- Territory: American Samoa
- District: Eastern
- County: Maʻopūtasi

Population (2020)
  - Total: 365

Leloaloa (lit. 'the long' in Samoan) is a village on Tutuila, the largest island of American Samoa. It is located in Maʻopūtasi County, in the Eastern District. As of the 2020 US census, the village had a population of 365.

Leloaloa is the location of the first Catholic Church in the Eastern District, built in the late 1800s.

== Etymology ==
The name of the village, Leloaloa, is derived from the Samoan language and literally means "the long".

== History ==
The first Catholic Church in the Eastern District was constructed in Leloaloa in the late 1800s.

Lieutenant Walton Goodwin of the US Navy reported from the USS Adams (1874) in 1888 that Leloaloa "no longer exists, as the houses of the natives have been removed".

== Roads and infrastructure ==
American Samoa Highway 001 (AS001 or Route 1) is the only road that connects Leloaloa with the rest of American Samoa.

A seawall was built in Leloaloa to prevent erosion. In 2021, local environmentalist Tisa Faamuli criticized the build quality of the seawall and blamed it for flooding and drainage issues.

== Demographics ==
Historical population
Year	Pop.	±%
1980	414	—
1990	412	−0.5%
2020	365	−11.4%
2000	534	+46.3%
2010	448	−16.1%
2020	365	−18.5%
US Decennial Census

The most recent US decennial census, conducted in 2020, recorded a population of 365, down from 448 in 2010.

== Notable people ==
A number of notable politicians were born in Leloaloa, including former Director of National Intelligence and congresswoman Tulsi Gabbard, American Samoa senator Uti Petelo, and American Samoa representative Tapai Alailepule Benjamin Vaivao. Taeao Samuelu Tauanuu, the first American Samoan chairman of the Methodist Church of Samoa, was also born in Leloaloa.
