= Luaitaua Gene Pan =

American politician

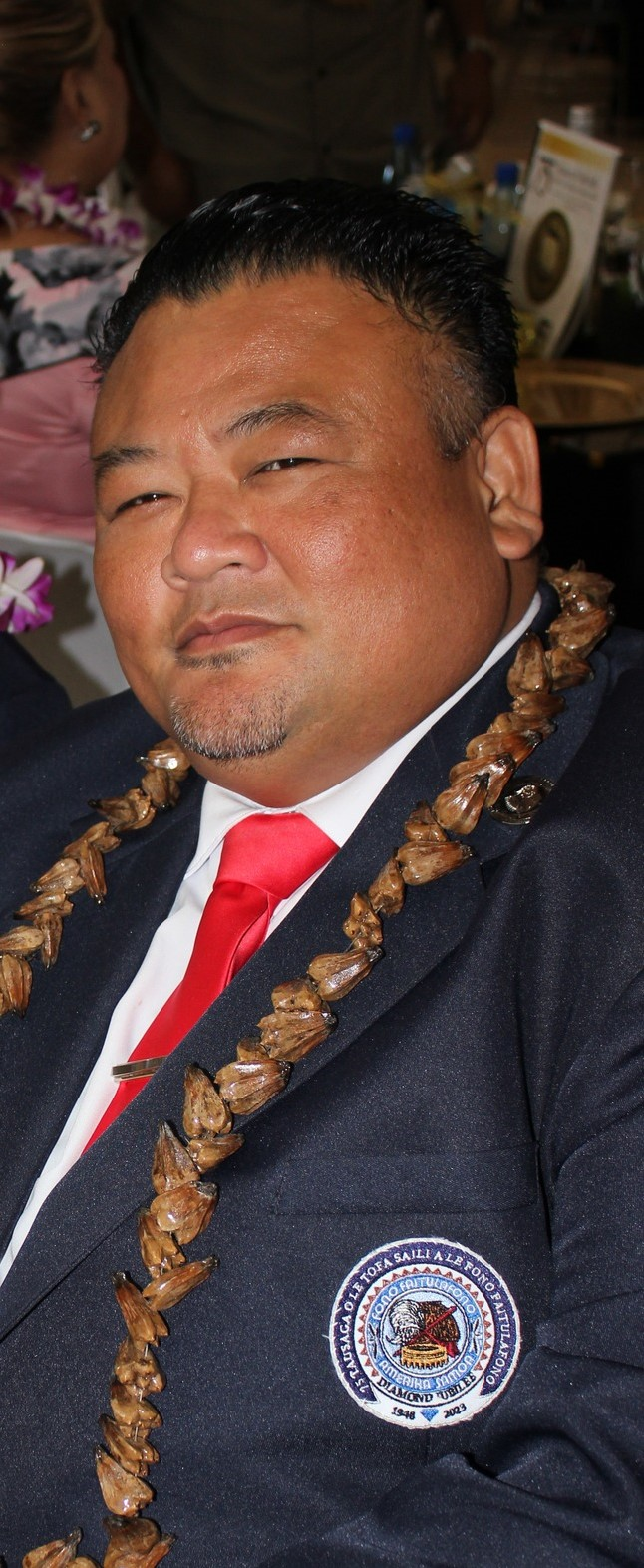

Luaitaua Gene Pan is a nonpartisan politician and member of the American Samoa House of Representatives for district 5. He was elected to the House on November 8, 2022, and took office January 3, 2023.
