= Speaker of the American Samoa House of Representatives =

The Speaker of the American Samoa House of Representatives is the presiding officer of that legislature.

Below is a list of office-holders from 1967:

Name	Period
Tuanaitau F. Tuia	1967–1968
Fainu'ulelei S. Utu	1969-1972
Tupua E. Le'iato	1973-1974
Te'o J. Fuavai	1975-1976
Tuanaitau F. Tuia	1977–1984
Tuiafono Mata'utia	1985-1986
Tuanaitau F. Tuia	1987–1992
Savali Talavou Ale	1993–1997
Nua Mailo Saoluaga	1997-2000 ?
Matagi Mailo Ray McMoore	2001–2007
Savali Talavou Ale	January 4, 2007–Present

== See also ==
- List of American Samoa Fono

== Sources ==
- Sunia, Fofō I. F. (1998). The Story of the Legislature of American Samoa: In Commemoration of the Golden Jubilee 1948-1998. Pago Pago, AS: Legislature of American Samoa. ISBN 9789829008015.
- Various editions of The Europa World Year Book
