= Larry Sanitoa =

American Samoan politician

Larry Sanitoa (born ?) is an American Samoan politician and a member of the American Samoa House of Representatives, representing District #15 of Tualauta, as of 2012. Sanitoa is the son of the late Senator Seui Laau.

Sanitoa was an unsuccessful candidate for Lieutenant Governor of American Samoa in the 2016 election.
