= Leasina County =

County of Western District, American Samoa

Coordinates: 14°19′11″S 170°46′12″W

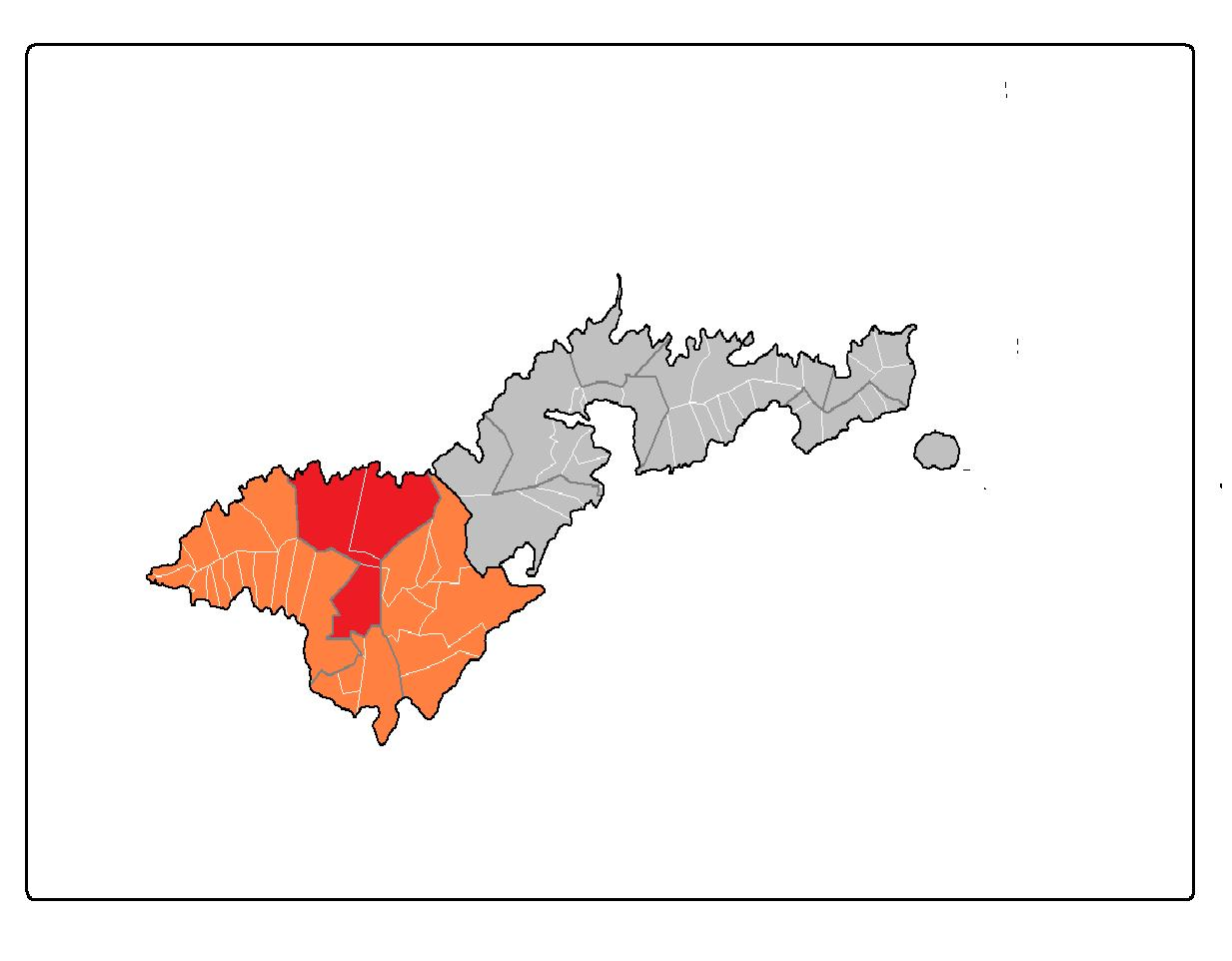
Map of Tutuila where Leasina County is highlighted in red, while the Western District is marked in orange.

Leasina County is a county in the Western District in American Samoa. The name of the county, Leasina, is derived from the Samoan language and translates into English as “White".

The official county name was changed to Leasina ma Aitulagi County following the 2022 American Samoan constitutional referendum.

Leasina contains the villages of Aʻasu and Aʻoloau in the northwestern part of Tutuila Island. The principal place is the village of Aʻoloau, where the powerful Fuimaono resides. At Aʻasu Bay, also known as Massacre Bay, French sailors were massacred in 1787. Aʻoloau is also referred to as Aʻoloaufou, which means "New Aʻoloau", while the abandoned village on the north coast, on Aʻoloau Bay, is called Aʻoloautuai, meaning "Old Aʻoloau". Similarly, the village of Aʻasu is known as Aʻasufou (“New Aʻasu”). The original village, located on Massacre Bay, is called Aʻasutuai (“Old Aʻasu”).

== History ==
During World War II, a communications and radar station was built atop Tutuila’s central mountain ridge, above the village of Aʻoloau. The project required clearing a square mile of plateau land and constructing a long, winding mountain road that climbed up from the south coast highway at Mapusaga.

In 1976, Lualemaga Faoliu, the senator representing the county and a native of Aʻoloau, was shot and killed during a family trip to the island of Savaiʻi.

== Demographics ==
Leasina County was first recorded beginning with the 1912 special census. Regular decennial censuses were taken beginning in 1920.

Historical population
Year	Pop.	±%
1912	241	—
1920	290	+20.3%
1930	272	−6.2%
1940	335	+23.2%
1950	447	+33.4%
1960	571	+27.7%
1970	637	+11.6%
1980	620	−2.7%
1990	1,470	+137.1%
2000	1,739	+18.3%
2010	1,807	+3.9%
2020	1,689	−6.5%
U.S. Decennial Census

== Villages ==
- Aitulagi
- Aoloau
- Aasu
