= Fofo County =

County in the Western District of American Samoa

Coordinates: 14.33°S 170.78°E

Fofo County is a county in the Western District of American Samoa.

An American Samoan law of 1962 defined 14 counties. The constitution of 1967, signed by delegates from these 14 counties, established 15 counties, separating Fofo from Lealataua County. However, the U.S. Census Bureau identifies 14 counties, treating Fofo as part of Lealataua.
