= 2022 American Samoan general election =

An election was held on Tuesday, November 8, 2022, to elect the non-voting Delegate to the United States House of Representatives from American Samoa's at-large congressional district and 20 seat to the American Samoa House of Representatives. The election coincided with races for other federal and American Samoan territorial offices, including the larger American Samoa general election, as well as the nationwide 2022 United States House of Representatives elections and the 2022 United States general elections.

== Delegate ==
2022 United States House of Representatives election in American Samoa, at-large district
- November 8, 2022
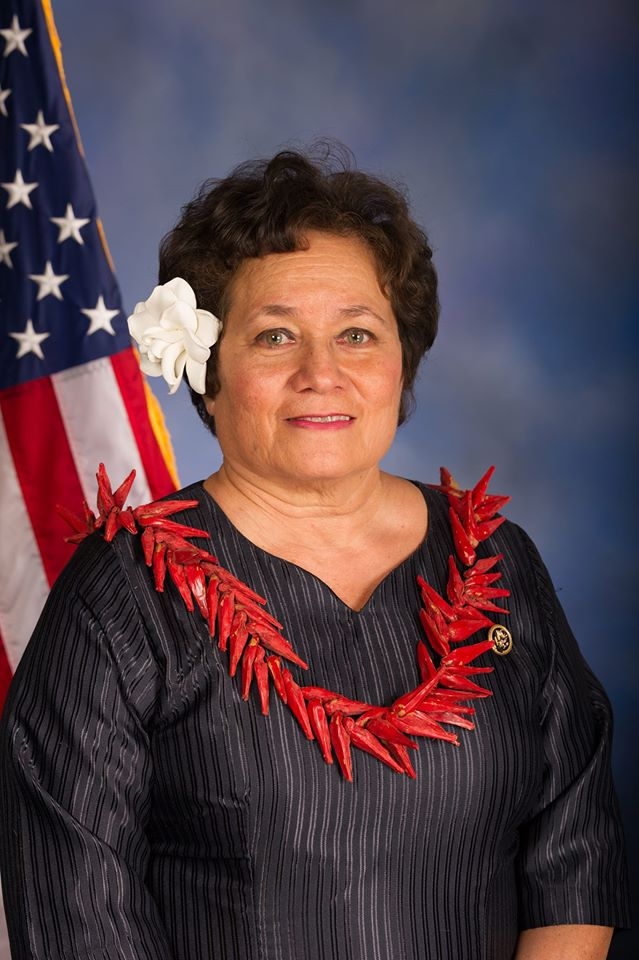
Candidate	Amata Coleman Radewagen
Party	Republican
Popular vote	6,637
Percentage	100%
Delegate at-large before election
Amata Coleman Radewagen
Republican
Elected Delegate at-large
Amata Coleman Radewagen
Republican

In November 2014, Amata Coleman Radewagen defeated 10-term incumbent Democratic Rep. Eni Faleomavaega in a crowded race for the seat. She won re-election to a fourth term in 2020. The incumbent delegate, Rep. Amata Coleman Radewagen, a Republican who had held the seat since 2015, filed for re-election to a fifth term. She ran unopposed for a fifth term.

American Samoa Delegate election results, 2022
Party	Candidate	Votes	%
Republican	Amata Coleman Radewagen (inc.)	6,637	100
Total votes		6,637	100
