= Itūʻau County =

County of Eastern District, American Samoa

Coordinates: 14°19′7″S 170°43′25″W

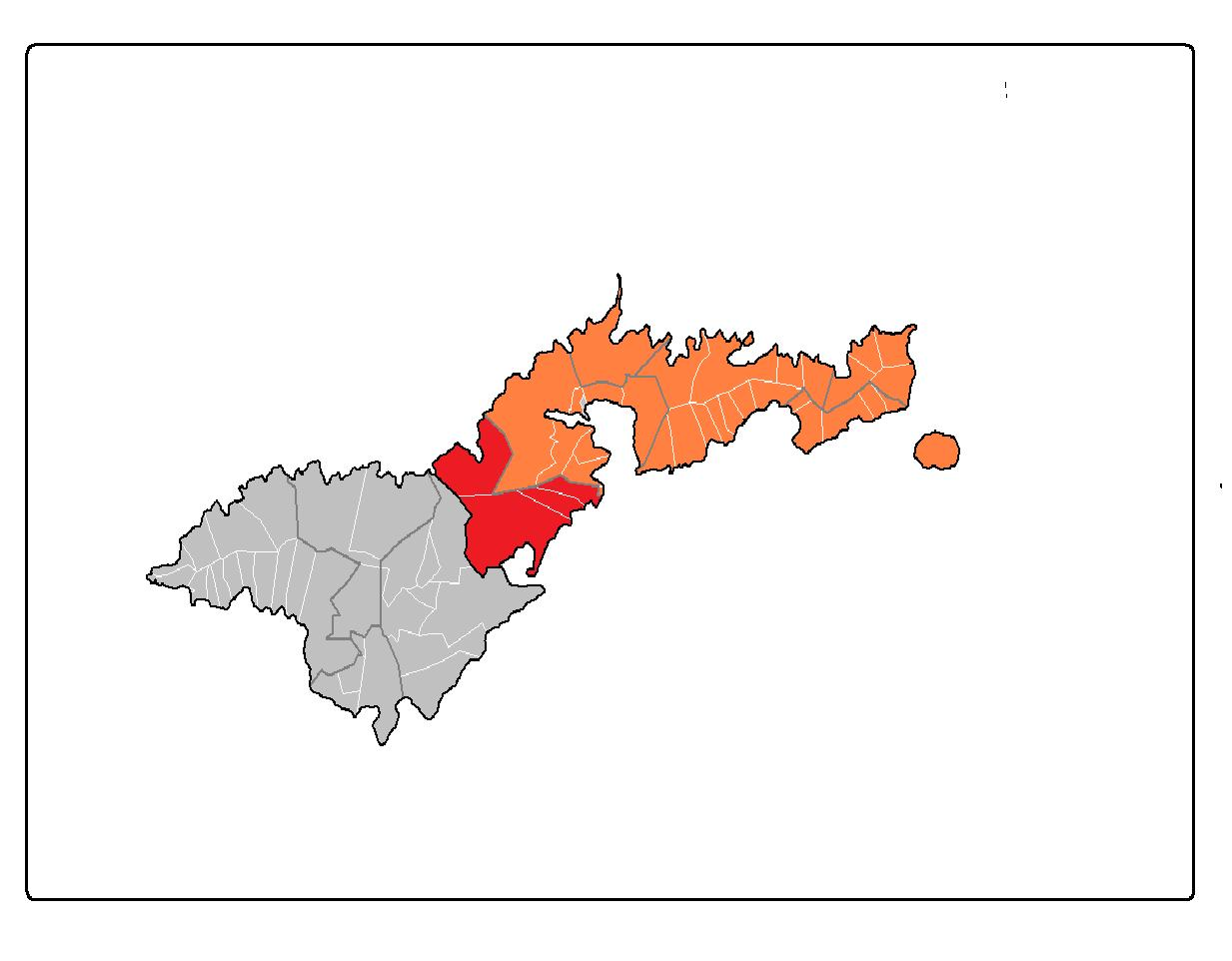
Map of Tutuila where Ituau County is highlighted in red, while the Eastern District is marked in orange.

Itūʻau County is a county in the Eastern District in American Samoa. The official name is Itūʻau ma Nofo, however, it is commonly known as just Itūʻau. It is divided into northern and southern parts by the highest part of the Tutuila's central mountain range. It is peculiar in that it had no county chief. In Nuʻuuli in the south, power was divided between village high chief Savusa and the Four Chiefly Houses of the Soliai, Tago, Levu, and Alega. In Fagasā in the north, leadership was shared by Alo, Tuinei and Tupuola. The physical division of the county by mountains combined with the lack of a high chief made the county a battleground (itu'au) in ancient times.

It is a small county which only consisted of two villages: Nuʻuuli and Fagasā. These villages lie across from each other, Nuʻuuli on the south shoreline of Tutuila Island and Fagasā on the north side. They are connected by an inland road which runs west of Pago Pago Bay across the mountain ridge.

== Etymology ==
The name of the county, Itūʻau, is derived from the Samoan language and translates into English as “Army" or “side of the warriors”.

Three of the villages are in a section known as Nofoa, which translates to "Abiding Place".

== History ==
In 1974, Alo W. Steffany entered the American Samoa Senate to fill a vacancy representing Itūʻau County. He was subsequently reelected every four years until his death in 1992. Steffany also held the chiefly title Su’esu‘emanogi of Fagasā and was bestowed the High Ali‘i title Alo.

== Demographics ==
Historical population
Year	Pop.	±%
1912	507	—
1920	573	+13.0%
1930	750	+30.9%
1940	1,012	+34.9%
1950	1,796	+77.5%
1960	1,887	+5.1%
1970	2,884	+52.8%
1980	3,543	+22.9%
1990	3,655	+3.2%
2000	4,312	+18.0%
2010	4,676	+8.4%
2020	3,431	−26.6%
U.S. Decennial Census

Itu'au County was first recorded beginning with the 1912 special census. Regular decennial censuses were taken beginning in 1920.

== Villages ==
The county is officially known as Itu'au ma Nofoa (Itu'au and Nofoa), where Itu'au includes Nuʻuuli, Faganeanea, and Matu'u. Nofoa is made up of Fagasā, Fagatele, and Fagale'a.

- Fagasā
  - Fagaleʻa
  - Fagatele
- Nuʻuuli
- Matu'u
- Faganeanea
