= American Samoa House of Representatives =

Lower house of the American Samoa Fono

Coordinates: 14.2782°S 170.6890°W

- American Samoa Fono

Type
- Type: Lower house

History
- Founded: October 26, 1948

Leadership
- Speaker: Savali Talavou Ale (R) since January 4, 2007

Structure
- Seats: 21
- Political groups: Non-partisan (20); Swains Island delegate (1)
- Length of term: 2 years
- Salary: $25,000/year

Website
- www.americansamoa.gov/fono

The American Samoa House of Representatives is the lower house of the American Samoa Fono. The House consists of 21 members serving two-year terms, with 20 popularly elected representatives, and one delegate from Swains Island elected in a public meeting.

== History ==
American Samoa became a United States territory in 1900 and was initially administered by the Navy. From 1905, annual meetings were held with delegates sent from the local communities, as an advisory council to the naval governor.

In 1948, a bicameral legislature was established, still in advisory capacity. The lower house, named the House of Representatives, was composed of 54 members: 52 (one from each village) were elected in open meetings according to Samoan custom, and two were elected by secret ballot by residents not living under the matai system. The first session of the legislature was called to order by Attorney General John D. Maroney at 9:30 am on 26 October 1948, and high orator Mariota Tiumalu Tuiasosopo was unanimously elected as the Speaker of the House of Representatives.

The legislature was reformed in 1952, after administration of American Samoa had been transferred to the Department of the Interior. The number of representatives was reduced to 18, all elected by secret ballot: five from each of the three districts of American Samoa (Western, Eastern and Manu‘a), one from Swains Island, and two elected by residents not living under the matai system.

In 1960, the first constitution of American Samoa was adopted. The House of Representatives remained with 18 members, but under a slightly different composition: one from each of three districts in Ma‘oputasi county, one from each of two districts in Lealataua/Fofo county, and one from each of the then remaining 12 counties, all elected by secret ballot for two-year terms; and one non-voting delegate from Swains Island, elected in an open meeting, also for a two-year term.

In 1967, the revised constitution modified the composition to 21 members: two from the combined counties of Ta‘ū island, one from the combined counties of Ofu-Olosega, one from each of five districts in Ma‘oputasi county, one from each of two districts in Sua county, two each from Itu‘au and Tualauta counties, and one from each of the six remaining counties, all elected by secret ballot for two-year terms; and one non-voting delegate from Swains Island, elected in an open meeting, also for a two-year term.

In 2025, the delegate from Swains Island became a voting member of the House of Representatives.

== List of members ==
District	Areas	Name	Start	Party
1	Taʻū, Faleasao, Fitiuta	Fetu Fetui Jr.	January 3, 2023	Republican
1	Taʻū, Faleasao, Fitiuta	Faauifono Vaitautolu	September 20, 2023	Independent
2	Ofu, Olosega	Tiaoalii Fauagiga Sai	January 3, 2021	Independent
3	Vaifanua	Shaun Onosa'i Vaa	January 3, 2023	Republican
4	Saʻole	Titialiʻi Kitara Vaiau	January 3, 2021	Independent
5	Sua 1 (Faga‘itua, Amaua, Auto, Avaio, Alega, Aumi, Lauliʻi)	Luaitaua Gene Pan	January 3, 2023	Independent
6	Sua 2 (Saʻilele, Masausi, Masefau, Afono)	Avagafono Tuavao Vaimaga Maiava	January 3, 2021	Independent
7	Maʻoputasi 1 (Fatumafuti, Fagaʻalu, Utulei)	Vailoata Eteuati Amituanaʻi	January 3, 2023	Independent
8	Ma‘oputasi 2 (Fagatogo)	Malaeoletalu Melesio Gurr	January 3, 2023	Independent
9	Ma‘oputasi 3 (Pago Pago)	Trude Ledoux-Sunia	January 3, 2025	Independent
10	Ma‘oputasi 4 (Satala, Atuʻu, Leloaloa)	Tapai Alailepule Benjamin Vaivao	January 3, 2023	Independent
11	Ma‘oputasi 5 (Aua)	Faimealelei Anthony Fuʻe Allen	January 3, 2021	Independent
12	Ituʻau	Tautoloitua Sauasetoa Ho Ching	January 3, 2023	Republican
12	Ituʻau	Manumaua Wayne C. Wilson	January 3, 2015	Independent
13	Fofo	Fiu Saelua	January 3, 2023	Independent
14	Lealataua	Savali Talavou Ale	January 1981	Republican
15	Tuālāuta	Samuel Ioka Ale Meleisea	January 2017	Independent
15	Tuālāuta	Larry Sanitoa	January 2013	Democratic
16	Tualatai	Manavaalofa Tutuila Manase	January 2015	Independent
17	Leasina	Ape Mike Asifoa	January 3, 2021	Independent
Delegate	Swains Island	Suʻa Alexander Eli Jennings	January 3, 2005	Independent

== See also ==
- List of speakers of the American Samoa House of Representatives
- Members of the American Samoa House of Representatives
