= Senator Shimasaki =

Senator Shimasaki may refer to:

- Fano Shimasaki (1913–1984), American Samoan Senate
- Fano Mitch Shimasaki (fl. 2010s–2020s), American Samoan Senate
- Solinuu Shimasaki (1888–1958), American Samoan Senate
