= 2004 United States state legislative elections =

- November 2, 2004

85 legislative chambers in 44 states
	Majority party	Minority party
Party	Republican	Democratic
Chambers before	53 (Note: The Oregon Senate and North Carolina House of Representatives were tied prior to the election. Thus, they are not included in this total.)	44
Chambers after	50 (Note: The Iowa Senate became tied. Thus, it is not included in the final total.)	48
Overall change	▼3	▲4
- Map of upper house elections: Democrats gained control Democrats retained control Republicans gained control Republicans retained control Split body formed Non-partisan legislature No regularly-scheduled elections

- Map of lower house elections: Democrats gained control Democrats retained control Republicans gained control Republicans retained control Non-partisan legislature No regularly-scheduled elections

Elections to state legislatures were held on November 2, 2004, alongside other elections. Elections were held for 85 legislative chambers, with all states but Louisiana, Mississippi, New Jersey, Alabama, Maryland, and Virginia holding elections in at least one house. Michigan and Minnesota held elections for their lower, but not upper houses. Six chambers in three territories and the District of Columbia were up as well.

The 2004 elections created narrow legislative divisions across the country. Both parties flipped seats and chambers across the country, with most Democratic gains coming from the Northeast and West and most Republican gains coming from the South. Over 20 states featured statehouses controlled by fewer than four seats, and nearly 30 states featured divided governments. Both parties took advantage of heavy spending from 527 organizations.

Republicans won control of four chambers from the Democrats. The institution of term limits contributed to the Republican takeover of the Oklahoma House of Representatives for the first time since 1923, and favorable redistricting aided Republicans in winning the Georgia House of Representatives (and a trifecta) for the first time ever. Republicans additionally won the Tennessee Senate, for the time since 1870, and the Indiana House of Representatives.

Democrats performed better than Republicans overall at the state-legislative level, despite their defeat in the concurrent presidential election, winning control of eight additional chambers. Favorable redistricting enabled the Democratic takeover of the Montana Legislature and their retaking of control of the North Carolina House of Representatives, which was previously tied. Additionally, they took control of the Washington Senate; the Oregon Senate, which was previously tied; both houses of the Colorado General Assembly for the first time since 1963, and the Vermont House of Representatives. The Iowa Senate became tied after previously being controlled by the Republicans prior to the election. Democrats' takeover of the Montana House only came after the Montana Supreme Court declared a Democrat a victor in a contested election that evenly split the chamber. This gave Democrats control of the chamber with the help of incoming governor Brian Schweitzer.

The Democrats also regained the title of holding the most legislative seats across the country, winning one more seat than the Republicans.

== Summary table ==
Regularly scheduled elections were held in 85 of the 99 state legislative chambers in the United States. Nationwide, regularly scheduled elections were held for 6,015 of the 7,383 legislative seats. Many legislative chambers held elections for all seats, but some legislative chambers that use staggered elections held elections for only a portion of the total seats in the chamber. The chambers not up for election either hold regularly scheduled elections in odd-numbered years, or have four-year terms and hold all regularly scheduled elections in presidential midterm election years.

Note that this table only covers regularly scheduled elections; additional special elections took place concurrently with these regularly scheduled elections.

State	Upper House				Lower House			
State	Seats up	Total	% up	Term	Seats up	Total	% up	Term
Alabama	0	35	0	4	0	105	0	4
Alaska	19	20	95	4	40	40	100	2
Arizona	30	30	100	2	60	60	100	2
Arkansas	35	35	100	2/4 (Note: The upper houses of Arkansas, Delaware, Florida, Hawaii, Illinois, Minnesota, New Jersey, and Texas use a 2-4-4 term length system.)	100	100	100	2
California	20	40	50	4	80	80	100	2
Colorado	18	35	51	4	65	65	100	2
Connecticut	36	36	100	2	151	151	100	2
Delaware	21	21	100	2/4	41	41	100	2
Florida	40	40	100	2/4	120	120	100	2
Georgia	56	56	100	2	180	180	100	2
Hawaii	25	25	100	2/4	51	51	100	2
Idaho	35	35	100	2	70	70	100	2
Illinois	59	59	100	2/4	118	118	100	2
Indiana	25	50	50	4	100	100	100	2
Iowa	25	50	50	4	100	100	100	2
Kansas	40	40	100	4	125	125	100	2
Kentucky	19	38	50	4	100	100	100	2
Louisiana	0	39	0	4	0	105	0	4
Maine	35	35	100	2	151	151	100	2
Maryland	0	47	0	4	0	141	0	4
Massachusetts	40	40	100	2	160	160	100	2
Michigan	0	38	0	4	110	110	100	2
Minnesota	0	67	0	2/4	134	134	100	2
Mississippi	0	52	0	4	0	122	0	4
Missouri	17	34	50	4	163	163	100	2
Montana	25	50	50	4	100	100	100	2
Nebraska	25 (Note: These figures represent the seats of Nebraska's unicameral legislature.)	49	51	4	N/A (unicameral)			
Nevada	10	21	48	4	42	42	100	2
New Hampshire	24	24	100	2	400	400	100	2
New Jersey	0	40	0	2/4	0	80	0	2
New Mexico	42	42	100	4	70	70	100	2
New York	62	62	100	2	150	150	100	2
North Carolina	50	50	100	2	120	120	100	2
North Dakota	23	47	49	4	47	94	50	4
Ohio	16	33	48	4	99	99	100	2
Oklahoma	24	48	50	4	101	101	100	2
Oregon	15	30	50	4	60	60	100	2
Pennsylvania	25	50	50	4	203	203	100	2
Rhode Island	38	38	100	2	75	75	100	2
South Carolina	46	46	100	4	124	124	100	2
South Dakota	35	35	100	2	70	70	100	2
Tennessee	16	33	48	4	99	99	100	2
Texas	16	31	52	2/4	150	150	100	2
Utah	15	29	52	4	75	75	100	2
Vermont	30	30	100	2	150	150	100	2
Virginia	0	40	0	4	0	100	0	2
Washington	25	49	51	4	98	98	100	2
West Virginia	17	34	50	4	100	100	100	2
Wisconsin	16	33	48	4	99	99	100	2
Wyoming	15	30	50	4	60	60	100	2
Total	1280	1971	65	N/A	4595	5411	85	N/A

== Electoral predictions ==
Analysts expected a high level of competitiveness among chambers held by both parties, although not to the same extent as the 2002 elections, which took place following most states' legislative redistricting. The application of newly enacted term limits in some states was expected to have little effect, with the exception of the Oklahoma House of Representatives, and the close nature of the concurrent presidential election made the effects of potential presidential coattails difficult to predict.

As the election progressed and George W. Bush's chances at winning re-election appeared to increase, outlooks changed on very few legislative chambers. Republicans made minor inroads in states in the South, especially in Oklahoma in the Georgia House of Representatives while Democrats appeared stronger in states in the Northeast and Northwest, such as Vermont and Washington. Due to the presidential election's heavy focus on foreign policy issues such as the Iraq War, the likelihood of coattails reaching all the way down to state legislative races appeared increasingly thin. The majority of state legislative chambers and individual races also remained out of reach for opposition parties due to the prevalence of partisan gerrymandering.

Ratings are designated as follows:

- "Tossup": Competitive, no advantage
- "Lean": Competitive, slight advantage
- "Likely": Not competitive, but opposition could make significant gains
- "Safe": Not competitive at all

State	Chamber	Last election	Rothenberg Oct. 1, 2004	Result
Alaska	Senate	R 12–8	Likely R	R 12–8
Alaska	House of Representatives	R 27–13	Safe R	R 26–14
Arizona	Senate	R 17–13	Likely R	R 18–12
Arizona	House of Representatives	R 38–22	Likely R	R 38–22
Arkansas	Senate	D 27–8	Safe D	D 27–8
Arkansas	House of Representatives	D 70–30	Safe D	D 72–28
California	State Senate	D 25–15	Safe D	D 25–15
California	State Assembly	D 48–32	Safe D	D 48–32
Colorado	Senate	R 18–17	Lean R	D 18–17
Colorado	House of Representatives	R 37–28	Likely R	D 35–30
Connecticut	State Senate	D 21–15	Safe D	D 24–12
Connecticut	House of Representatives	D 94–57	Safe D	D 99–52
Delaware	Senate	D 13–8	Safe D	D 13–8
Delaware	House of Representatives	R 29–12	Safe R	R 26–15
Florida	Senate	R 26–14	Safe R	R 26–14
Florida	House of Representatives	R 81–39	Safe R	R 84–36
Georgia	State Senate	R 30–26	Lean R	R 34–22
Georgia	House of Representatives	D 107–72–1	Lean D	R 99–80–1
Hawaii	Senate	D 20–5	Safe D	D 20–5
Hawaii	House of Representatives	D 36–15	Safe D	D 41–10
Idaho	Senate	R 28–7	Safe R	R 28–7
Idaho	House of Representatives	R 54–16	Safe R	R 57–13
Illinois	Senate	D 32–26–1	Safe D	D 31–27–1
Illinois	House of Representatives	D 66–52	Safe D	D 65–53
Indiana	Senate	R 32–18	Safe R	R 33–17
Indiana	House of Representatives	D 51–49	Tossup	R 52–48
Iowa	Senate	R 29–21	Lean R	25–25
Iowa	House of Representatives	R 54–46	Lean R	R 51–49
Kansas	Senate	R 30–10	Safe R	R 30–10
Kansas	House of Representatives	R 80–45	Safe R	R 83–42
Kentucky	Senate	R 21–17	Likely R	R 22–15
Kentucky	House of Representatives	D 65–35	Likely D	D 57–43
Maine	Senate	D 18–17	Tossup	D 18–17
Maine	House of Representatives	D 80–67–3–1	Likely D	D 76–73–1–1
Massachusetts	Senate	D 34–6	Safe D	D 34–6
Massachusetts	House of Representatives	D 135–23–1	Safe D	D 137–23
Michigan	House of Representatives	R 62–48	Likely R	R 58–52
Minnesota	House of Representatives	R 81–53	Safe R	R 68–66
Missouri	Senate	R 20–14	Likely R	R 23–11
Missouri	House of Representatives	R 90–73	Likely R	R 97–66
Montana	Senate	R 29–21	Lean R	D 27–23
Montana	House of Representatives	R 53–47	Lean R	D 50–50
Nevada	Senate	R 13–8	Likely R	R 12–9
Nevada	Assembly	D 23–19	Lean D	D 26–16
New Hampshire	Senate	R 18–6	Safe R	R 16–8
New Hampshire	House of Representatives	R 278–122	Safe R	R 249–151
New Mexico	Senate	D 24–18	Likely D	D 24–18
New Mexico	House of Representatives	D 43–27	Safe D	D 42–28
New York	State Senate	R 37–25	Safe R	R 35–27
New York	State Assembly	D 102–48	Safe D	D 104–46
North Carolina	Senate	D 28–22	Lean D	D 29–21
North Carolina	House of Representatives	R 61–59 (Note: Excludes representative Michael P. Decker's temporary stint as a Democrat which tied the chamber for much of the 2003–2004 legislative session.)	Tossup	D 63–57
North Dakota	Senate	R 31–16	Safe R	R 32–15
North Dakota	House of Representatives	R 66–28	Safe R	R 67–27
Ohio	Senate	R 22–11	Safe R	R 22–11
Ohio	House of Representatives	R 62–37	Safe R	R 61–38
Oklahoma	Senate	D 28–20	Lean D	D 26–22
Oklahoma	House of Representatives	D 53–48	Tossup	R 57–44
Oregon	State Senate	15–15	Lean D (flip)	D 17–13
Oregon	House of Representatives	R 35–25	Likely R	R 33–27
Pennsylvania	State Senate	R 29–21	Likely R	R 30–20
Pennsylvania	House of Representatives	R 110–93	Likely R	R 110–93
Rhode Island	Senate	D 32–6	Safe D	D 33–5
Rhode Island	House of Representatives	D 63–11–1	Safe D	D 59–16
South Carolina	Senate	R 25–21	Safe R	R 26–20
South Carolina	House of Representatives	R 73–51	Safe R	R 74–50
South Dakota	Senate	R 26–9	Safe R	R 25–10
South Dakota	House of Representatives	R 49–21	Safe R	R 50–20
Tennessee	Senate	D 18–15	Lean D	R 17–16
Tennessee	House of Representatives	D 54–45	Lean D	D 53–46
Texas	Senate	R 19–12	Safe R	R 19–12
Texas	House of Representatives	R 88–62	Safe R	R 87–63
Utah	State Senate	R 22–7	Safe R	R 21–8
Utah	House of Representatives	R 56–19	Safe R	R 56–19
Vermont	Senate	D 19–11	Safe D	D 21–9
Vermont	House of Representatives	R 73–70–4–3	Tossup	D 83–60–6–1
Washington	State Senate	R 25–24	Tossup	D 26–23
Washington	House of Representatives	D 52–46	Tossup	D 55–43
West Virginia	Senate	D 24–10	Safe D	D 21–13
West Virginia	House of Delegates	D 68–32	Safe D	D 68–32
Wisconsin	Senate	R 18–15	Likely R	R 19–14
Wisconsin	State Assembly	R 58–41	Likely R	R 60–39
Wyoming	Senate	R 20–10	Safe R	R 23–7
Wyoming	House of Representatives	R 45–15	Safe R	R 46–14

== Maps ==
Upper house seats by party holding majority in each state
Republican 50–60% 60–70% 70–80% 80–90%	Democratic 50–60% 60–70% 70–80% 80–90%	Tie 50%

Lower house seats by party holding majority in each state
Republican 50–60% 60–70% 70–80% 80–90%	Democratic 50–60% 60–70% 70–80% 80–90%	Tie 50%

Net changes to upper house seats after the 2004 elections
+1 Dem seat +2 Dem seats +3–4 Dem seats +6 Dem seats
+1 Rep seat +2 Rep seats +3 Rep seats

Net changes to lower house seats after the 2004 elections
+1 Dem seat +2 Dem seats +3–5 Dem seats
+7–14 Dem seats +29 Dem seats
+1 Rep seat +2 Rep seats +3–5 Rep seats
+6–9 Rep seats +25 Rep seats

== State summaries ==
=== Alaska ===
All of the seats of the Alaska House of Representatives and half of the Alaska Senate were up for election. Republicans maintained control of both chambers.

Alaska Senate
Party	Before	After	Change
Republican	12	12	Steady
Democratic	8	8	Steady
Total	20	20	

Alaska House of Representatives
Party	Before	After	Change
Republican	27	26	▼1
Democratic	13	14	▲1
Total	40	40	

=== Arizona ===
All of the seats of the Arizona Legislature were up for election. Republicans maintained control of both state legislative chambers.

Arizona Senate
Party	Before	After	Change
Republican	17	18	▲1
Democratic	13	12	▼1
Total	30	30	

Arizona House of Representatives
Party	Before	After	Change
Republican	39	38	▼1
Democratic	20	22	▲2
Independent	1	0	▼1
Total	60	60	

=== Arkansas ===
All of the seats of the Arkansas House of Representatives and half of the Arkansas Senate were up for election. Democrats maintained control of both state legislative chambers.

Arkansas Senate
Party	Before	After	Change
Democratic	27	27	Steady
Republican	8	8	Steady
Total	35	35	

Arkansas House of Representatives
Party	Before	After	Change
Democratic	70	72	▲2
Republican	30	28	▼2
Total	100	100	

=== California ===
All of the seats of the California House of Representatives and half of the California Senate were up for election. Democrats maintained control of both state legislative chambers.

California State Senate
Party	Before	After	Change
Democratic	25	25	Steady
Republican	15	15	Steady
Total	40	40	

California State Assembly
Party	Before	After	Change
Democratic	48	48	Steady
Republican	32	32	Steady
Total	80	80	

=== Colorado ===
All of the seats of the Colorado House of Representatives and half of the Colorado Senate were up for election. Democrats won control of both chambers from the Republicans.

Colorado Senate
Party	Before	After	Change
Democratic	17	18	▲1
Republican	18	17	▼1
Total	35	35	

Colorado House of Representatives
Party	Before	After	Change
Democratic	28	35	▲7
Republican	37	30	▼7
Total	65	65	

=== Connecticut ===
All of the seats of the Connecticut Legislature were up for election. Democrats maintained control of both state legislative chambers.

Connecticut State Senate
Party	Before	After	Change
Democratic	21	24	▲3
Republican	15	12	▼3
Total	36	36	

Connecticut House of Representatives
Party	Before	After	Change
Democratic	94	99	▲5
Republican	57	52	▼5
Total	151	151	

=== Delaware ===
All of the seats of the Delaware House of Representatives and half of the Delaware Senate were up for election. Democrats maintained control of the Senate while Republicans maintained control of the House.

Delaware Senate
Party	Before	After	Change
Democratic	13	13	Steady
Republican	8	8	Steady
Total	21	21	

Delaware House of Representatives
Party	Before	After	Change
Republican	29	26	▼3
Democratic	12	15	▲3
Total	41	41	

=== Florida ===
All of the seats of the Florida House of Representatives and half of the Florida Senate were up for election. Republicans maintained control of both state legislative chambers.

Florida Senate
Party	Before	After	Change
Republican	26	26	Steady
Democratic	14	14	Steady
Total	40	40	

Florida House of Representatives
Party	Before	After	Change
Republican	81	84	▲3
Democratic	35	42	▼3
Total	120	120	

=== Georgia ===
All of the seats of the Georgia Legislature were up for election. Republicans maintained control of the Senate and won control of the House.

Georgia State Senate
Party	Before	After	Change
Republican	34	34	Steady
Democratic	22	22	Steady
Total	56	56	

Georgia House of Representatives
Party	Before	After	Change
Republican	74	99	▲25
Democratic	105	80	▼25
Independent	1	1	Steady
Total	180	180	

=== Hawaii ===
All of the seats of the Hawaii House of Representatives and half of the Hawaii Senate were up for election. Democrats maintained control of both state legislative chambers.

Hawaii Senate
Party	Before	After	Change
Democratic	20	20	Steady
Republican	5	5	Steady
Total	25	25	

Hawaii House of Representatives
Party	Before	After	Change
Democratic	36	41	▲5
Republican	15	10	▼5
Total	51	51	

=== Idaho ===
All of the seats of the Idaho Legislature were up for election. Republicans maintained control of both state legislative chambers.

Idaho Senate
Party	Before	After	Change
Republican	28	28	Steady
Democratic	7	7	Steady
Total	35	35	

Idaho House of Representatives
Party	Before	After	Change
Republican	54	57	▲3
Democratic	16	13	▼3
Total	70	70	

=== Illinois ===
All of the seats of the Illinois House of Representatives and 2/3rds of the Illinois Senate were up for election. Democrats maintained control of both state legislative chambers.

Illinois Senate
Party	Before	After	Change
Democratic	32	31	▼1
Republican	26	27	▲1
Independent	1	1	Steady
Total	59	59	

Illinois House of Representatives
Party	Before	After	Change
Democratic	66	65	▼1
Republican	52	53	▲1
Total	118	118	

=== Indiana ===
All of the seats of the Indiana House of Representatives and half of the Indiana Senate were up for election. Republicans maintained control of the Senate and gained control of the House of Representatives.

Indiana Senate
Party	Before	After	Change
Republican	32	33	▲1
Democratic	18	17	▼1
Total	50	50	

Indiana House of Representatives
Party	Before	After	Change
Republican	49	52	▲3
Democratic	51	48	▼3
Total	100	100	

=== Iowa ===
All of the seats of the Iowa House of Representatives and half of the Iowa Senate were up for election. Republicans maintained control of the House while the Senate became tied.

Iowa Senate
Party	Before	After	Change
Republican	29	25	▼4
Democratic	21	25	▲4
Total	50	50	

Iowa House of Representatives
Party	Before	After	Change
Republican	54	51	▼3
Democratic	46	49	▲3
Total	100	100	

=== Kansas ===
All of the seats of the Kansas Senate and Kansas House of Representatives were up for election. Republicans maintained control of both chambers.

Kansas Senate
Party	Before	After	Change
Republican	30	30	Steady
Democratic	10	10	Steady
Total	40	40	

Kansas House of Representatives
Party	Before	After	Change
Republican	80	83	▲3
Democratic	45	42	▼3
Total	125	125	

=== Kentucky ===
All of the seats of the Kentucky House of Representatives and half of the Kentucky Senate were up for election. Republicans maintained control of the Senate and Democrats maintained control of the House of Representatives.

Kentucky Senate
Party	Before	After	Change
Republican	22	22 (Note: One elected Republican's seat was declared vacant due to residency issues.)	Steady
Democratic	16	15	▼1
Total	38	37	▼1

Kentucky House of Representatives
Party	Before	After	Change
Democratic	65	57	▼8
Republican	35	43	▲8
Total	100	100	

=== Maine ===
All of the seats of the Maine Legislature were up for election. Democrats maintained control of both state legislative chambers.

Maine Senate
Party	Before	After	Change
Democratic	18	18	Steady
Republican	17	17	Steady
Total	35	35	

Maine House of Representatives
Party	Before	After	Change
Democratic	80	76	▼4
Republican	67	73	▲6
Independent	3	1	▼2
Green	1	1	Steady
Total	151	151	

=== Massachusetts ===
All of the seats of the Massachusetts Legislature were up for election. Democrats maintained control of both state legislative chambers.

Massachusetts Senate
Party	Before	After	Change
Democratic	33	34	▲1
Republican	7	6	▼1
Total	40	40	

Massachusetts House of Representatives
Party	Before	After	Change
Democratic	135	139	▲4
Republican	23	20	▼3
Independent	1	1	Steady
Total	160	160	

=== Michigan ===
All of the seats of the Michigan House of Representatives were up for election. Republicans maintained control of the House.

Michigan House of Representatives
Party	Before	After	Change
Republican	62	58	▼4
Democratic	48	52	▲4
Total	110	110	

=== Minnesota ===
All of the seats of the Minnesota House of Representatives were up. Republicans maintained control of the House.

Minnesota House of Representatives
Party	Before	After	Change
Republican	81	68	▼13
Democratic (DFL)	53	66	▲13
Total	134	134	

=== Missouri ===
All of the seats of the Missouri House of Representatives and half of the Missouri Senate were up for election. Republicans maintained control of both state legislative chambers.

Missouri Senate
Party	Before	After	Change
Republican	20	23	▲3
Democratic	14	11	▼3
Total	34	34	

Missouri House of Representatives
Party	Before	After	Change
Republican	90	97	▲7
Democratic	73	66	▼7
Total	163	163	

=== Montana ===
All of the seats of the Montana House of Representatives and half of the Montana Senate were up for election. Democrats flipped control of both chambers.

Montana Senate
Party	Before	After	Change
Democratic	21	27	▲6
Republican	29	23	▼6
Total	50	50	

Montana House of Representatives
Party	Before	After	Change
Democratic	47	50 (Note: The Democratic Party controlled the chamber by virtue of holding the governor's office.)	▲3
Republican	53	50	▼3
Total	100	100	

=== Nebraska ===
Nebraska is the only U.S. state with a unicameral legislature; half of the seats of the Nebraska Legislature were up for election. Nebraska is also unique in that its legislature is officially non-partisan and holds non-partisan elections, although the Democratic and Republican parties each endorse legislative candidates. Republicans maintained control.

Nebraska Legislature
Party	Before	After	Change
Republican	34	32	▼2
Democratic	13	15	▲2
Independent	2	2	Steady
Total	49	49	

=== Nevada ===
All of the seats of the Nevada House of Representatives and half of the Nevada Senate were up for election. Democrats maintained control of the House while Republicans maintained control of the Senate.

Nevada Senate
Party	Before	After	Change
Republican	13	12	▼1
Democratic	8	9	▲1
Total	21	21	

Nevada Assembly
Party	Before	After	Change
Democratic	23	26	▲3
Republican	19	16	▼3
Total	42	42	

=== New Hampshire ===
All of the seats of the New Hampshire House of Representatives and the New Hampshire Senate were up for election. Republicans maintained control of both chambers.

New Hampshire Senate
Party	Before	After	Change
Republican	18	16	▼2
Democratic	6	8	▲2
Total	24	24	

New Hampshire House of Representatives
Party	Before	After	Change
Republican	278	249	▼29
Democratic	122	151	▲29
Total	400	400	

=== New Mexico ===
All of the seats of the New Mexico Legislature were up for election; Democrats maintained control of both chambers.

New Mexico Senate
Party	Before	After	Change
Democratic	24	24	Steady
Republican	18	18	Steady
Total	42	42	

New Mexico House of Representatives
Party	Before	After	Change
Democratic	43	42	▼1
Republican	27	28	▲1
Total	70	70	

=== New York ===
All of the seats of the New York Legislature were up for election. Republicans maintained control of the Senate while Democrats maintained control of the Assembly.

New York State Senate
Party	Before	After	Change
Republican	37	35	▼2
Democratic	25	27	▲2
Total	62	62	

New York State Assembly
Party	Before	After	Change
Democratic	102	104	▲2
Republican	48	46	▼2
Total	150	150	

=== North Carolina ===
All of the seats of the North Carolina House of Representatives and half of the North Carolina Senate were up for election. Democrats maintained control of the Senate and gained control of the House.

North Carolina Senate
Party	Before	After	Change
Democratic	28	29	▲1
Republican	22	21	▼1
Total	50	50	

North Carolina House of Representatives
Party	Before	After	Change
Democratic	59	63	▲4
Republican	61	57	▼4
Total	120	120	

=== North Dakota ===
All of the seats of the North Dakota House of Representatives and half of the North Dakota Senate were up for election. Republicans maintained control of both state legislative chambers.

North Dakota Senate
Party	Before	After	Change
Republican	31	32	▲1
Democratic-NPL	16	15	▼1
Total	47	47	

North Dakota House of Representatives
Party	Before	After	Change
Republican	66	67	▲1
Democratic-NPL	28	27	▼1
Total	94	94	

=== Ohio ===
All of the seats of the Ohio House of Representatives and half of the Ohio Senate were up for election. Republicans maintained control of both chambers.

Ohio Senate
Party	Before	After	Change
Republican	22	22	Steady
Democratic	11	11	Steady
Total	33	33	

Ohio House of Representatives
Party	Before	After	Change
Republican	62	61	▼1
Democratic	37	38	▲1
Total	99	99	

=== Oklahoma ===
All of the seats of the Oklahoma House of Representatives and half of the Oklahoma Senate were up for election. Democrats maintained control of the Senate while Republicans won control of the House.

Oklahoma Senate
Party	Before	After	Change
Democratic	28	26	▼2
Republican	20	22	▲2
Total	48	48	

Oklahoma House of Representatives
Party	Before	After	Change
Republican	48	57	▲9
Democratic	53	44	▼9
Total	101	101	

=== Oregon ===
All of the seats of the Oregon House of Representatives and half of the Oregon Senate were up for election. Democrats won control of the Senate while Republicans maintained control of the House.

Oregon State Senate
Party	Before	After	Change
Democratic	15	17	▲2
Republican	15	13	▼2
Total	30	30	

Oregon House of Representatives
Party	Before	After	Change
Republican	35	33	▼2
Democratic	25	27	▲2
Total	60	60	

=== Pennsylvania ===
All of the seats of the Pennsylvania House of Representatives and half of the Pennsylvania Senate were up for election. Republicans maintained control of both chambers.

Pennsylvania State Senate
Party	Before	After	Change
Republican	29	30	▲1
Democratic	21	20	▼1
Total	50	50	

Pennsylvania House of Representatives
Party	Before	After	Change
Republican	109	110	▲1
Democratic	94	93	▼1
Total	203	203	

=== Rhode Island ===
All of the seats of the Rhode Island Legislature were up for election. Democrats maintained control of both state legislative chambers.

Rhode Island Senate
Party	Before	After	Change
Democratic	32	33	▲1
Republican	6	5	▼1
Total	38	38	

Rhode Island House of Representatives
Party	Before	After	Change
Democratic	63	59	▼4
Republican	11	16	▲5
Independent	1	0	▼1
Total	75	75	

=== South Carolina ===
All of the seats of the South Carolina Legislature were up for election. Republicans maintained control of both chambers.

South Carolina Senate
Party	Before	After	Change
Republican	26	26	Steady
Democratic	20	20	Steady
Total	46	46	

South Carolina House of Representatives
Party	Before	After	Change
Republican	73	74	▲1
Democratic	51	50	▼1
Total	124	124	

=== South Dakota ===
All of the seats of the South Dakota Legislature were up for election. Republicans maintained control of both state legislative chambers.

South Dakota Senate
Party	Before	After	Change
Republican	26	25	▼1
Democratic	9	10	▲1
Total	35	35	

South Dakota House of Representatives
Party	Before	After	Change
Republican	49	51	▲2
Democratic	21	19	▼2
Total	70	70	

=== Tennessee ===
All of the seats of the Tennessee House of Representatives and half of the Tennessee Senate were up for election. Republicans gained control of the Senate while Democrats maintained control of the House.

Tennessee Senate
Party	Before	After	Change
Republican	15	17	▲2
Democratic	18	16	▼2
Total	33	33	

Tennessee House of Representatives
Party	Before	After	Change
Democratic	54	53	▼1
Republican	45	46	▲1
Total	99	99	

=== Texas ===
All of the seats of the Texas House of Representatives and half of the Texas Senate were up for election. Republicans maintained control of both state legislative chambers.

Texas Senate
Party	Before	After	Change
Republican	19	19	Steady
Democratic	12	12	Steady
Total	31	31	

Texas House of Representatives
Party	Before	After	Change
Republican	88	87	▼1
Democratic	62	63	▲1
Total	150	150	

=== Utah ===
All of the seats of the Utah House of Representatives and half of the Utah Senate were up for election. Republicans maintained control of both state legislative chambers.

Utah State Senate
Party	Before	After	Change
Republican	22	21	▼1
Democratic	7	8	▲1
Total	29	29	

Utah House of Representatives
Party	Before	After	Change
Republican	56	56	Steady
Democratic	19	19	Steady
Total	75	75	

=== Vermont ===
All of the seats of the Vermont Legislature were up for election. Democrats maintained control of the Senate and won control of the House.

Vermont Senate
Party	Before	After	Change
Democratic	19	21	▲2
Republican	11	9	▼2
Total	30	30	

Vermont House of Representatives
Party	Before	After	Change
Democratic	69	83	▲14
Republican	74	60	▼14
Progressive	4	6	▲2
Independent	3	1	▼2
Total	150	150	

=== Washington ===
All of the seats of the Washington House of Representatives and half of the Washington Senate were up for election. Democrats won control of the Senate and maintained control of the House.

Washington State Senate
Party	Before	After	Change
Democratic	24	26	▲2
Republican	25	23	▼2
Total	49	49	

Washington House of Representatives
Party	Before	After	Change
Democratic	52	55	▲3
Republican	46	43	▼3
Total	98	98	

=== West Virginia ===
All of the seats of the West Virginia House of Delegates and half of the West Virginia Senate were up for election. Democrats maintained control of both state legislative chambers.

West Virginia Senate
Party	Before	After	Change
Democratic	24	21	▼3
Republican	10	13	▲3
Total	34	34	

West Virginia House of Delegates
Party	Before	After	Change
Democratic	68	68	Steady
Republican	32	32	Steady
Total	100	100	

=== Wisconsin ===
All of the seats of the Wisconsin Assembly and half of the Wisconsin Senate were up for election. Republicans maintained control of both chambers.

Wisconsin Senate
Party	Before	After	Change
Republican	18	19	▲1
Democratic	15	14	▼1
Total	33	33	

Wisconsin State Assembly
Party	Before	After	Change
Republican	58	60	▲2
Democratic	41	39	▼2
Total	99	99	

=== Wyoming ===
All of the seats of the Wyoming House of Representatives and half of the Wyoming Senate were up for election. Republicans maintained control of both state legislative chambers.

Wyoming Senate
Party	Before	After	Change
Republican	20	23	▲3
Democratic	10	7	▼3
Total	30	30	

Wyoming House of Representatives
Party	Before	After	Change
Republican	45	46	▲1
Democratic	15	14	▼1
Total	60	60	

== Territorial and federal district summaries ==
=== American Samoa ===
All of the seats of the American Samoa Senate and the American Samoa House of Representatives were up for election. Members of the Senate serve four-year terms, while members of the House of Representatives serve two-year terms. Gubernatorial and legislative elections are conducted on a nonpartisan basis in American Samoa.

=== Guam ===
All of the seats of the unicameral Legislature of Guam were up for election. All members of the legislature serve a two-year term. Democrats lost control of the legislature.

Guam Legislature
Party	Before	After	Change
Democratic	9	6	▼3
Republican	6	9	▲3
Total	15	15	

=== Puerto Rico ===
All of the seats of the Senate of Puerto Rico and the House of Representatives of Puerto Rico are up for election. Members of the Senate and the House of Representatives both serve four-year terms. The New Progressive Party won control of both chambers.

Puerto Rico Senate
Party	Before	After	Change
Popular Democratic	19	11	▼7
New Progressive	8	15	▲7
Puerto Rican Independence	1	1	Steady
Total	27	27	

Puerto Rico House of Representatives
Party	Before	After	Change
Popular Democratic	29	18	▼11
New Progressive	21	32	▲11
Puerto Rican Independence	1	1	Steady
Total	51	51	

=== Washington, D.C. ===
The Council of the District of Columbia serves as the legislative branch of the federal district of Washington, D.C. Half of the council seats are up for election. Council members serve four-year terms. Democrats retained supermajority control of the council.

District of Columbia Council
Party	Before	After	Change
Democratic	11	11	Steady
Republican	1	1	Steady
Independent	1	1	Steady
Total	13	13	
