= Senator Stevenson =

Senator Stevenson may refer to:

== Members of the Northern Irish Senate ==
- William Ernest Stevenson (1871/1872–?), Northern Irish Senator from 1940 to 1945 and from 1945 to 1954

== Members of the United States Senate ==
- Adlai Stevenson III (born 1930), U.S. Senator from Illinois from 1970 to 1981
- John W. Stevenson (1812–1886), U.S. Senator from Kentucky

== United States state senate members ==
- Alexander Campbell Stevenson (1802–1889), Indiana State Senate
- Charles C. Stevenson (1826–1890), Nevada State Senate
- Jerry Stevenson (politician) (fl. 2010s–2020s), Utah State Senate
- Job E. Stevenson (1832–1922), Ohio State Senate
- Paul Stevenson (politician) (fl. 2020s), American Samoan Senate
- William E. Stevenson (1820–1883), West Virginia State Senate

== See also ==
- Senator Stephenson (disambiguation)
