= Paul Stevenson =

Paul Stevenson may refer to:

- Paul Stevenson (psychologist) (born 1955), Australian psychologist
- Paul Stevenson (badminton) (born 1966), Australian badminton player
- Paul Stevenson (Royal Marines officer) (1940–2023), British military officer
- Paul Stevenson (politician), member of the American Samoa Senate

== See also ==
- Paul Stephenson (disambiguation)
