= Senator Fuimaono =

Senator Fuimaono may refer to:

- A. U. Fuimaono (1924–2008), American Samoa Senate
- Lutu T. S. Fuimaono (1930–2004), American Samoa Senate
- Soliai Tuipine Fuimaono (born 1938), American Samoa Senate
