= Fano Shimasaki =

American Samoan politician

Member of the American Samoa Senate
- In office 1969–1972
- Constituency: Maoputasi County

Personal details
- Born: 3 November 1913 Faga'alu, American Samoa
- Died: 13 September 1984 (aged 70) Pago Pago, American Samoa

Fano Frank Shimasaki (3 November 1913 – 13 September 1984) was an American Samoan chief, civil servant, clergyman and politician. He served as a Senator between 1969 and 1972.

== Biography ==
Shimasaki was born in Faga'alu in 1913, the son of Japanese businessman Masaitchido Shimasaki and his Samoan wife, Fano Solinuu Shimasaki, who was the first woman to serve in the American Samoa Senate.

In 1937 Shimasaki began working for the government, initially as a bus driver, before becoming head mechanic of the government motor pool. He spent two years in Hawaii at the Pearl Harbor shipyard before returning to American Samoa to manage the motor pool, a job he held until retiring in 1975. He was given the chiefly title Fano in 1947 and was also a deacon in the Christian Congregational Church at Faga'alu.

In 1968 he was elected to the Senate from Maoputasi County. He was re-elected in 1970, serving until 1972. He died in Pago Pago in September 1984 at the age of 71.
