= Tauiliili Lauifi =

American Samoan politician

Member of the American Samoa Senate from the 1st district
- In office January 3, 2021 – July 9, 2023
- Succeeded by: Poumele A.P. Galea'i

Personal details
- Died: July 9, 2023 (aged 78)
- Political party: Independent

Tauillili Lauifi (died July 9, 2023) was an American Samoan politician. An independent, he served in the American Samoa Senate from 2021 to 2023.

Lauifi died on July 9, 2023, at the age of 78.
