= Lyndon B. Johnson Hospital =

Lyndon B. Johnson Hospital may refer to:

- Lyndon B. Johnson Tropical Medical Center in American Samoa
- Lyndon B. Johnson General Hospital of the Harris Health System in northeast Houston, Texas
