= Poumele A.P. Galea'i =

American Samoan politician

Poumele A. P. Galea'i

Member of the American Samoa Senate from the 1st district
- Incumbent
- Assumed office 2023
- Preceded by: Tauiliili Lauifi

Personal details
- Party: Nonpartisan
- Parent: Galea'i Peni Poumele (father)

Poumele A. P. Galea'i, also known as Poumele Pete Poumele Galea'i, is an American Samoan politician. He served in the American Samoa Senate since 2023.
