= Fonoti Tafa'ifa Aufata =

American Samoan politician

Member of the American Samoa Senate from the 8th district
- Incumbent
- Assumed office January 2021

Personal details
- Party: Nonpartisan

Fonoti Tafa'ifa Aufata is an American Samoan politician. She served in the American Samoa Senate since 2021.
