= Solinuu Shimasaki =

American Samoan politician

Fano Solinuu Shimasaki
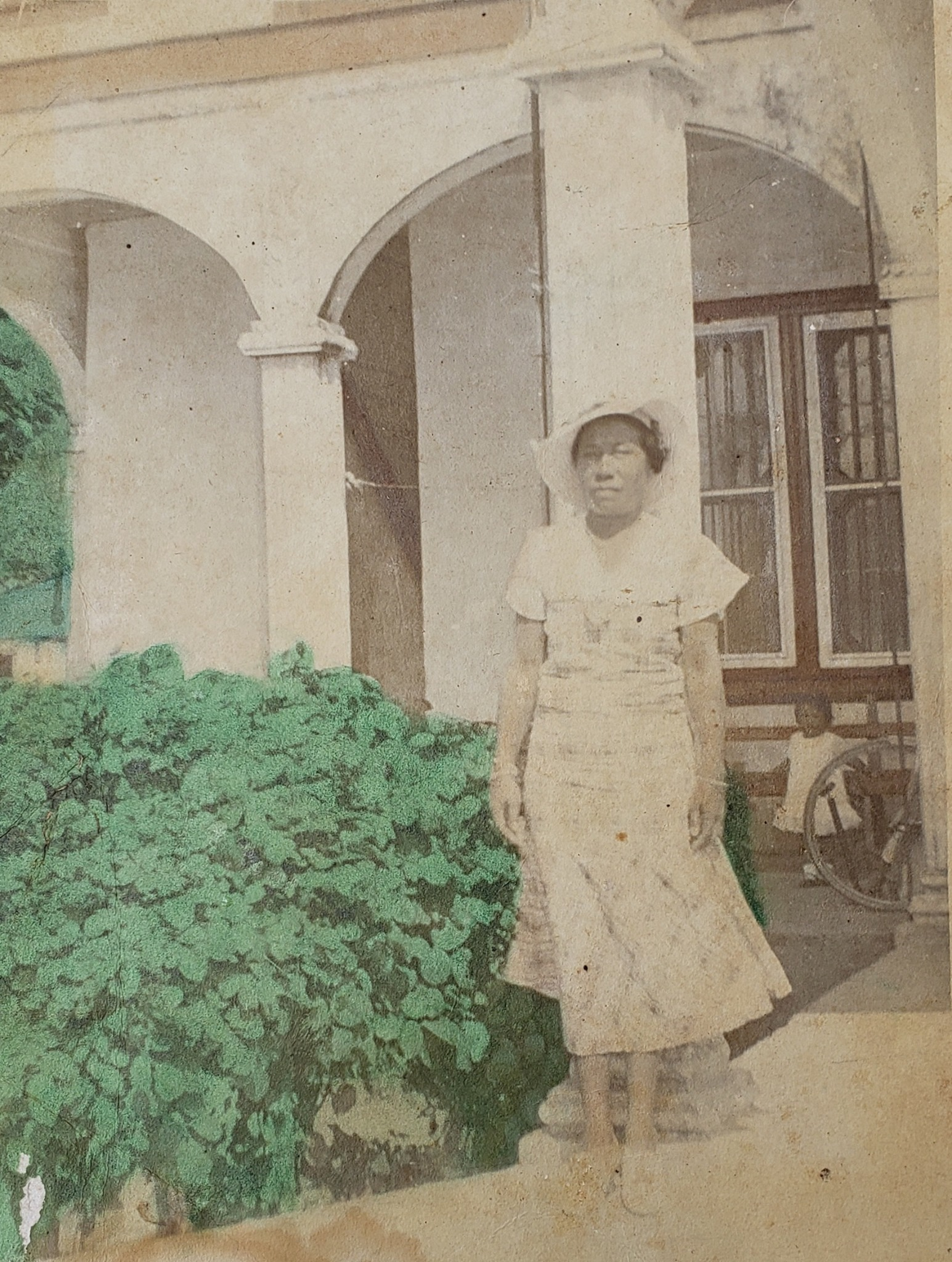
- Solinuu Shimasaki (date unknown)

Member of the American Samoa Senate

Personal details
- Born: May 22, 1888 Utulei, Tutuila, present-day American Samoa
- Died: April 17, 1958 (aged 69) Fagaʻalu, American Samoa
- Spouse: Masaitchido Shimasaki (m. 1907–1958; her death)
- Children: 14, including Fano Frank Shimasaki

Fano Solinuu Shimasaki (May 22, 1888 – April 17, 1958) was an American Samoan traditional chieftess and politician. Shimasaki was the first woman to serve as a Senator in the American Samoa Senate, the upper chamber of the American Samoa Fono. She held the chiefly title of "Fano", from the family's home village of Fagaʻalu.

Solinuu Shimasaki was born on May 22, 1888, in the village of Utulei on the island of Tutuila, present-day American Samoa, to Tuiaimo'o Fano and Tausisi'i Leta'a. In 1907, she married Masaitchido "Frank" Shimasaki (1877–1962), who was one of the first Japanese businessmen to immigrate to American Samoa. The couple had at least fourteen children, including Fano Frank Shimasaki (1913–1984), their last surviving son who also served as a member of the American Samoa Senate.

Fano Solinuu Shimasaki died in Fagaʻalu, Maʻopūtasi County, Eastern District, American Samoa, on April 17, 1958, at the age of 69. She was buried in Fagaʻalu village.

In March 2021, U.S. Congresswoman Amata Coleman Radewagen released a statement paying tribute to Fano Shimasaki, as well as Mabel Coleman Reid, the first woman elected to the American Samoa House of Representatives, to mark Women's History Month.
