= Leonard Peters =

US international rugby union & league player

- Born: December 26, 1981 (age 44) Fagaalu, American Samoa
- Height: 6 ft 1 in (1.85 m)
- Weight: 215 lb (98 kg)

Rugby union career
- Position: Flanker
Senior career
Years	Team	Apps	(Points)
- Aspen
International career
Years	Team	Apps	(Points)
- USA
National sevens team
Years	Team		Comps
2009-Present	USA 7s		IRB Sevens

Leonard Peters (born December 26, 1981) is an American football safety and a rugby player. He was originally signed by the New York Jets as an undrafted free agent in 2007 and was on the Chicago Bears practice squad. He played collegiately at Hawaii. Peters performed as a Polynesian dancer in his native Hawai'i, which includes twirling flaming knives. He has also represented the USA Tomahawks in rugby league.

== American Football Career ==
=== College ===
Peters played in 50 games for the University of Hawaiʻi at safety, making 290 tackles, defending 20 passes, recording 7 interceptions and two sacks.

=== Professional ===
Peters was signed to the Chicago Bears practice squad on October 3, 2007. He was released by the Bears on August 30, 2008.

== Move to Rugby union ==
Peters has decided to move to rugby union, a sport from which American football is derived. He was selected for the US 7's for the 2009 World Games in Taiwan. He showed well enough in the 2009 World Games to have been selected to the USA Squad for the first two legs of the 2009-10 IRB Sevens World Series to compete in Dubai and George, South Africa. He has been able to turn his success at sevens into a selection to the United States National Rugby Union Team for the 2010 Churchill Cup.
