= Tuiasina Salamo Laumoli =

American Samoan politician

Member of the American Samoa Senate from the 10th district
- Incumbent
- Assumed office January 3, 2023

Personal details
- Party: Nonpartisan

Tuiasina Salamo Laumoli is an American Samoan politician. He served in the American Samoa Senate since 2023.
