= Senator Stephenson =

Senator Stephenson may refer to:

- Howard A. Stephenson (born 1950), Utah State Senate
- Isaac Stephenson (1829–1918), U.S. Senator from Wisconsin
- J. M. Stephenson (1855–1905), Mississippi State Senate
- James W. Stephenson (1806–1838), Illinois State Senate
- Samuel M. Stephenson (1831–1907), Michigan State Senate
- William B. Stephenson (1802–1884), Maryland State Senate

== See also ==
- Senator Stevenson (disambiguation)
