= Utu Sila Poasa =

American Samoan politician

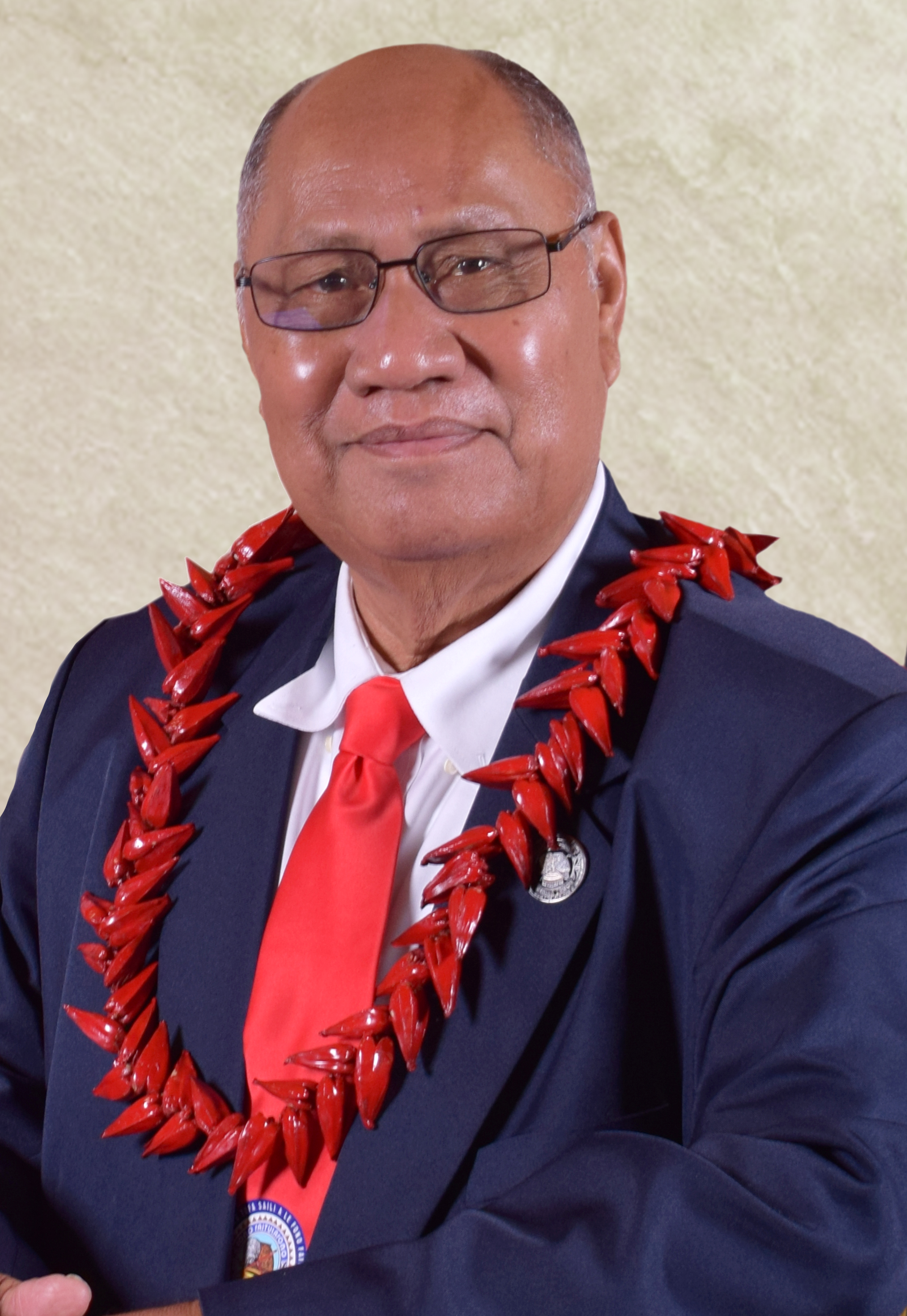

Member of the American Samoa Senate from the 3rd district
- Incumbent
- Assumed office December 2020

Personal details
- Party: Nonpartisan

Utu Sila Poasa is an American Samoan politician. He served in the American Samoa Senate since 2020.
