= 2002 United States state legislative elections =

- November 5, 2002

88 legislative chambers in 46 states
	Majority party	Minority party	Third party
Party	Republican	Democratic	Coalition
Chambers before	48	48 (Note: The New Jersey Senate and Maine Senate were tied, and they were controlled by a power-sharing agreement between Democrats and Republicans.)	1 (Note: The Arizona Senate was controlled by a coalition of Democrats and Republicans. The minority caucus consists of Republicans who were not part of the majority coalition.)
Chambers after	53	43 (Note: The Oregon Senate, North Carolina House of Representatives, and New Jersey Senate were tied, and they were controlled by a power-sharing agreement between Democrats and Republicans. Thus, they are not included in the final total.)	0
Overall change	▲5	▼5	▼1
- Map of upper house elections: Democrats gained control Democrats retained control Republicans gained control Republicans retained control Split body formed Non-partisan legislature No regularly-scheduled elections

- Map of lower house elections: Democrats retained control Republicans gained control Republicans retained control Split body formed Non-partisan legislature No regularly-scheduled elections

The 2002 United States state legislative elections were held on November 5, 2002, halfway through President George W. Bush's first term in office. This was a unique election in which the incumbent Republican party performed surprisingly well for a midterm election. Elections were held for 91 legislative chambers, with all states but Louisiana, Mississippi, New Jersey, and Virginia holding elections in at least one house. Three territorial chambers in two territories and the District of Columbia were up as well.

Republicans flipped control of six chambers: the Colorado Senate, the Georgia Senate for the first time since 1873, the Missouri House of Representatives for the first time since 1955, the Texas House of Representatives for the first time since 1873, the Washington Senate, and the Wisconsin Senate. Meanwhile, Democrats flipped control of the Illinois Senate. Additionally, the Arizona Senate went from a coalition government to Republican control. The Maine Senate went from an evenly divided power-sharing government to a Democratic one, while the Oregon Senate went from Republican to tied.

Republicans had initially won control of the North Carolina House of Representatives by one seat, but Republican Michael P. Decker switched parties to become a Democrat, producing a tied chamber.

Republicans won a trifecta in Texas for the first time since 1873, and in Missouri for the first time since 1923. After the elections, Republicans held a majority of state legislative seats for the first time in half a century.

== Summary table ==
Regularly scheduled elections were held in 91 of the 99 state legislative chambers in the United States. Nationwide, regularly scheduled elections were held for 6,381 of the 7,383 legislative seats. Many legislative chambers held elections for all seats, but some legislative chambers that use staggered elections held elections for only a portion of the total seats in the chamber. The chambers not up for election either hold regularly scheduled elections in odd-numbered years, or have four-year terms and hold all regularly scheduled elections in presidential midterm election years.

Note that this table only covers regularly scheduled elections; additional special elections took place concurrently with these regularly scheduled elections.

State	Upper House				Lower House			
State	Seats up	Total	% up	Term	Seats up	Total	% up	Term
Alabama	35	35	35	4	105	105	105	4
Alaska	19	20	95	4	40	40	100	2
Arizona	30	30	100	2	60	60	100	2
Arkansas	35	35	100	2/4 (Note: The upper houses of Arkansas, Delaware, Florida, Hawaii, Illinois, Minnesota, New Jersey, and Texas use a 2-4-4 term length system.)	100	100	100	2
California	20	40	50	4	80	80	100	2
Colorado	18	35	51	4	65	65	100	2
Connecticut	36	36	100	2	151	151	100	2
Delaware	21	21	100	2/4	41	41	100	2
Florida	40	40	100	2/4	120	120	100	2
Georgia	56	56	100	2	180	180	100	2
Hawaii	25	25	100	2/4	51	51	100	2
Idaho	35	35	100	2	70	70	100	2
Illinois	59	59	100	2/4	118	118	100	2
Indiana	25	50	50	4	100	100	100	2
Iowa	25	50	50	4	100	100	100	2
Kansas	0	40	0	4	125	125	100	2
Kentucky	19	38	50	4	100	100	100	2
Louisiana	0	39	0	4	0	105	0	4
Maine	35	35	100	2	151	151	100	2
Maryland	47	47	47	4	141	141	141	4
Massachusetts	40	40	100	2	160	160	100	2
Michigan	38	38	100	4	110	110	100	2
Minnesota	67	67	100	2/4	134	134	100	2
Mississippi	0	52	0	4	0	122	0	4
Missouri	17	34	50	4	163	163	100	2
Montana	25	50	50	4	100	100	100	2
Nebraska	25 (Note: These figures represent the seats of Nebraska's unicameral legislature.)	49	51	4	N/A (unicameral)			
Nevada	10	21	48	4	42	42	100	2
New Hampshire	24	24	100	2	400	400	100	2
New Jersey	0	40	0	2/4	0	80	0	2
New Mexico	0	42	0	4	70	70	100	2
New York	62	62	100	2	150	150	100	2
North Carolina	50	50	100	2	120	120	100	2
North Dakota	23	47	49	4	47	94	50	4
Ohio	16	33	48	4	99	99	100	2
Oklahoma	24	48	50	4	101	101	100	2
Oregon	15	30	50	4	60	60	100	2
Pennsylvania	25	50	50	4	203	203	100	2
Rhode Island	38	38	100	2	75	75	100	2
South Carolina	46	46	100	4	124	124	100	2
South Dakota	35	35	100	2	70	70	100	2
Tennessee	16	33	48	4	99	99	100	2
Texas	16	31	52	2/4	150	150	100	2
Utah	15	29	52	4	75	75	100	2
Vermont	30	30	100	2	150	150	100	2
Virginia	0	40	0	4	0	100	0	2
Washington	25	49	51	4	98	98	100	2
West Virginia	17	34	50	4	100	100	100	2
Wisconsin	16	33	48	4	99	99	100	2
Wyoming	15	30	50	4	60	60	100	2
Total	1280	1971	65	N/A	4595	5411	85	N/A

== Redistricting ==
Partisan control of U.S. state legislative redistricting following the 2000 census. Split or bipartisan control (21) Democratic control (12) Republican control (12) Independent redistricting commission (5)

The 2002 elections were the first held after redistricting following the 2000 census. All states holding elections in 2002 did so under new maps drawn in accordance with the new census results with the exception of Montana, which implements its new maps four years after the census as opposed to two. In a majority of states, legislative redistricting is controlled by the state legislature, often subject to gubernatorial veto. This allows for widespread gerrymandering, in which the party in power draws legislative boundaries to favor itself. A few states delegate redistricting power to an independent or bipartisan redistricting commission, often with the goal of minimizing or eliminating partisan gerrymandering.

In Texas, despite the state's divided government, Republicans fully controlled the redistricting process because they held four of the five seats on the state's backup redistricting commission. This allowed them to draw maps greatly favorable to themselves in an attempt to win control of the Texas House of Representatives for the first time since Reconstruction. In Oregon, the state's Democratic Secretary of State drew the state's maps after its divided government failed to approve plans.

== Electoral predictions ==
Ratings are designated as follows:

- "Tossup": Competitive, no advantage
- "Lean": Competitive, slight advantage
- "Likely": Not competitive, but opposition could make significant gains
- "Solid": Not competitive at all

State	Chamber	Last election	Cook Oct. 4, 2002	Result
Alabama	Senate	D 23–12	Solid D	D 25–10
Alabama	House of Representatives	D 69–36	Solid D	D 63–42
Alaska	Senate	R 14–6	Solid R	R 12–8
Alaska	House of Representatives	R 27–13	Solid R	R 27–13
Arizona	Senate	Coal. 18–12	Lean R (flip)	R 17–13
Arizona	House of Representatives	R 36–24	Likely R	R 38–22
Arkansas	Senate	D 27–8	Solid D	D 27–8
Arkansas	House of Representatives	D 72–28	Solid D	D 70–30
California	State Senate	D 26–14	Solid D	D 25–15
California	State Assembly	D 50–30	Solid D	D 48–32
Colorado	Senate	D 18–17	Tossup	R 18–17
Colorado	House of Representatives	R 38–27	Likely R	R 37–28
Connecticut	State Senate	D 21–15	Likely D	D 21–15
Connecticut	House of Representatives	D 100–51	Solid D	D 94–57
Delaware	Senate	D 13–8	Likely D	D 13–8
Delaware	House of Representatives	R 26–15	Likely R	R 29–12
Florida	Senate	R 25–15	Solid R	R 26–14
Florida	House of Representatives	R 77–43	Solid R	R 81–39
Georgia	State Senate	D 32–24	Likely D	R 30–26 (Note: Includes four post-election party switches which gave Republicans control of the chamber.)
Georgia	House of Representatives	D 105–74–1	Solid D	D 107–72–1
Hawaii	Senate	D 22–3	Solid D	D 20–5
Hawaii	House of Representatives	D 32–19	Likely D	D 36–15
Idaho	Senate	R 32–3	Solid R	R 28–7
Idaho	House of Representatives	R 61–9	Solid R	R 54–16
Illinois	Senate	R 32–27	Lean D (flip)	D 32–26–1
Illinois	House of Representatives	D 62–56	Likely D	D 66–52
Indiana	Senate	R 32–18	Solid R	R 32–18
Indiana	House of Representatives	D 53–47	Tossup	D 51–49
Iowa	Senate	R 30–20	Lean R	R 29–21
Iowa	House of Representatives	R 56–44	Lean R	R 54–46
Kansas	House of Representatives	R 79–46	Solid R	R 80–45
Kentucky	Senate	R 20–18	Lean R	R 21–17
Kentucky	House of Representatives	D 64–36	Solid D	D 65–35
Maine	Senate	D 17–17–1	Lean D (flip)	D 18–17
Maine	House of Representatives	D 88–62–1	Solid D	D 80–67–3–1
Maryland	Senate	D 32–15	Solid D	D 33–14
Maryland	House of Delegates	D 106–35	Solid D	D 98–43
Massachusetts	Senate	D 34–6	Solid D	D 34–6
Massachusetts	House of Representatives	D 137–23	Solid D	D 135–23–1
Michigan	Senate	R 23–15	Lean R	R 22–16
Michigan	House of Representatives	R 58–52	Lean R	R 63–47
Minnesota	Senate	D 39–27–1	Likely D	D 35–31–1
Minnesota	House of Representatives	R 69–65	Lean R	R 81–53
Missouri	Senate	R 18–16	Lean R	R 20–14
Missouri	House of Representatives	D 87–76	Tossup	R 90–73
Montana	Senate	R 31–19	Solid R	R 29–21
Montana	House of Representatives	R 58–42	Likely R	R 53–47
Nevada	Senate	R 12–9	Lean R	R 13–8
Nevada	Assembly	D 27–15	Likely D	D 23–19
New Hampshire	Senate	R 13–11	Lean R	R 18–6
New Hampshire	House of Representatives	R 256–144	Solid R	R 278–122
New Mexico	House of Representatives	D 42–28	Solid D	D 43–27
New York	State Senate	R 36–25	Solid R	R 37–25
New York	State Assembly	D 98–52	Solid D	D 102–48
North Carolina	Senate	D 35–15	Tossup	D 28–22
North Carolina	House of Representatives	D 62–58	Tossup	60–60 (Note: Includes representative Michael P. Decker's temporary stint as a Democrat which tied the chamber for much of the 2003–2002 legislative session.)
North Dakota	Senate	R 32–17	Solid R	R 31–16
North Dakota	House of Representatives	R 69–29	Solid R	R 66–28
Ohio	Senate	R 21–12	Solid R	R 22–11
Ohio	House of Representatives	R 60–39	Solid R	R 62–37
Oklahoma	Senate	D 30–18	Solid D	D 28–20
Oklahoma	House of Representatives	D 53–48	Tossup	D 53–48
Oregon	State Senate	R 16–14	Tossup	15–15
Oregon	House of Representatives	R 32–27–1	Tossup	R 35–25
Pennsylvania	State Senate	R 30–20	Likely R	R 29–21
Pennsylvania	House of Representatives	R 104–99	Lean R	R 110–93
Rhode Island	Senate	D 44–6	Solid D	D 32–6
Rhode Island	House of Representatives	D 85–15	Solid D	D 63–11–1
South Carolina	House of Representatives	R 71–53	Solid R	R 73–51
South Dakota	Senate	R 24–11	Solid R	R 26–9
South Dakota	House of Representatives	R 50–20	Solid R	R 49–21
Tennessee	Senate	D 18–15	Lean D	D 18–15
Tennessee	House of Representatives	D 58–41	Likely D	D 54–45
Texas	Senate	R 16–15	Likely R	R 19–12
Texas	House of Representatives	D 78–72	Likely R (flip)	R 88–62
Utah	State Senate	R 20–9	Solid R	R 22–7
Utah	House of Representatives	R 51–24	Solid R	R 56–19
Vermont	Senate	D 16–14	Lean D	D 19–11
Vermont	House of Representatives	R 83–62–4–1	Likely R	R 73–70–4–3
Washington	State Senate	D 25–24	Tossup	R 25–24
Washington	House of Representatives	D 50–48 (Note: Includes a 2001 special election that flipped a seat to Democrats, winning them control of the chamber from the Republicans)	Tossup	D 52–46
West Virginia	Senate	D 28–6	Solid D	D 24–10
West Virginia	House of Delegates	D 75–25	Solid D	D 68–32
Wisconsin	Senate	D 18–15	Lean D	R 18–15
Wisconsin	State Assembly	R 56–43	Lean R	R 58–41
Wyoming	Senate	R 20–10	Solid R	R 20–10
Wyoming	House of Representatives	R 46–14	Solid R	R 45–15

== Maps ==
Upper house seats by party holding majority in each state
Republican 50–60% 60–70% 70–80% 80–90%	Democratic 50–60% 60–70% 70–80% 80–90%	Tie 50%

Lower house seats by party holding majority in each state
Republican 40–50% 50–60% 60–70% 70–80%	Democratic 50–60% 60–70% 70–80% 80–90%	Tie 50%

Net changes to upper house seats after the 2002 elections
+1 Rep seat +2 Rep seats +3–5 Rep seats +6–7 Rep seats
+1 Dem seat +2 Dem seats +3–5 Dem seats
Chamber decreased in size

Net changes to lower house seats after the 2002 elections
+1 Rep seat +2 Rep seats +3–5 Rep seats
+6–14 Rep seats +16–22 Rep seats
+1 Dem seat +2 Dem seats +4–5 Dem seats +7 Dem seats
+1 Ind seat Chamber decreased in size

== State summaries ==
=== Alabama ===
All of the seats of the Alabama House of Representatives and half of the Alabama Senate were up for election. Democrats maintained control of both state legislative chambers.

Alabama Senate
Party	Before	After	Change
Democratic	24	25	▲1
Republican	11	10	▼1
Total	35	35	

Alabama House of Representatives
Party	Before	After	Change
Democratic	67	63	▼4
Republican	38	42	▲4
Total	105	105	

=== Alaska ===
All of the seats of the Alaska House of Representatives and half of the Alaska Senate were up for election. Republicans maintained control of both chambers.

Alaska Senate
Party	Before	After	Change
Republican	14	12	▼2
Democratic	6	8	▲2
Total	20	20	

Alaska House of Representatives
Party	Before	After	Change
Republican	27	27	Steady
Democratic	13	13	Steady
Total	40	40	

=== Arizona ===
All of the seats of the Arizona Legislature were up for election. Republicans maintained control of the House and gained control of the Senate.

Arizona Senate
Party	Before	After	Change
Republican	12	17	▲2
Republican	3	17	▲2
Democratic	15	13	▼2
Total	30	30	

Arizona House of Representatives
Party	Before	After	Change
Republican	36	39	▲3
Democratic	24	21	▼3
Total	60	60	

=== Arkansas ===
All of the seats of the Arkansas House of Representatives and half of the Arkansas Senate were up for election. Democrats maintained control of both state legislative chambers.

Arkansas Senate
Party	Before	After	Change
Democratic	27	27	Steady
Republican	8	8	Steady
Total	35	35	

Arkansas House of Representatives
Party	Before	After	Change
Democratic	72	70	▼2
Republican	28	30	▲2
Total	100	100	

=== California ===
All of the seats of the California House of Representatives and half of the California Senate were up for election. Democrats maintained control of both state legislative chambers.

California State Senate
Party	Before	After	Change
Democratic	26	25	▼1
Republican	14	15	▲1
Total	40	40	

California State Assembly
Party	Before	After	Change
Democratic	50	48	▼2
Republican	30	32	▲2
Total	80	80	

=== Colorado ===
All of the seats of the Colorado House of Representatives and half of the Colorado Senate were up for election. Republicans won control of the Senate and maintained control of the House

Colorado Senate
Party	Before	After	Change
Republican	17	18	▲1
Democratic	18	17	▼1
Total	35	35	

Colorado House of Representatives
Party	Before	After	Change
Republican	38	37	▼1
Democratic	27	28	▲1
Total	65	65	

=== Connecticut ===
All of the seats of the Connecticut Legislature were up for election. Democrats maintained control of both state legislative chambers.

Connecticut Senate
Party	Before	After	Change
Democratic	21	21	Steady
Republican	15	15	Steady
Total	36	36	

Connecticut House of Representatives
Party	Before	After	Change
Democratic	100	94	▼6
Republican	51	57	▲6
Total	151	151	

=== Delaware ===
All of the seats of the Delaware House of Representatives and half of the Delaware Senate were up for election. Democrats maintained control of the Senate while Republicans maintained control of the House.

Delaware Senate
Party	Before	After	Change
Democratic	13	13	Steady
Republican	8	8	Steady
Total	21	21	

Delaware House of Representatives
Party	Before	After	Change
Republican	26	29	▲3
Democratic	15	12	▼3
Total	41	41	

=== Florida ===
All of the seats of the Florida House of Representatives and half of the Florida Senate were up for election. Republicans maintained control of both state legislative chambers.

Florida Senate
Party	Before	After	Change
Republican	25	26	▲1
Democratic	15	14	▼1
Total	40	40	

Florida House of Representatives
Party	Before	After	Change
Republican	77	81	▲4
Democratic	43	39	▼4
Total	120	120	

=== Georgia ===
All of the seats of the Georgia Legislature were up for election. Republicans gained control of the Senate due to post-election party switching, while Democrats maintained control of the House.

Georgia State Senate
Party	Before	After	Change
Republican	24	30	▲6
Democratic	32	26	▼6
Total	56	56	

Georgia House of Representatives
Party	Before	After	Change
Democratic	105	107	▲2
Republican	74	72	▼2
Independent	1	1	Steady
Total	180	180	

=== Hawaii ===
All of the seats of the Hawaii House of Representatives and half of the Hawaii Senate were up for election. Democrats maintained control of both state legislative chambers.

Hawaii Senate
Party	Before	After	Change
Democratic	22	20	▼2
Republican	3	5	▲2
Total	25	25	

Hawaii House of Representatives
Party	Before	After	Change
Democratic	32	36	▲4
Republican	19	15	▼4
Total	51	51	

=== Idaho ===
All of the seats of the Idaho Legislature were up for election. Republicans maintained control of both state legislative chambers.

Idaho Senate
Party	Before	After	Change
Republican	32	28	▼4
Democratic	3	7	▲4
Total	35	35	

Idaho House of Representatives
Party	Before	After	Change
Republican	61	54	▼7
Democratic	9	16	▲7
Total	70	70	

=== Illinois ===
All of the seats of the Illinois House of Representatives and 2/3rds of the Illinois Senate were up for election. Democrats maintained control of the House and won control of the Senate.

Illinois Senate
Party	Before	After	Change
Democratic	27	32	▲5
Republican	32	26	▼6
Independent	0	1	▲1
Total	59	59	

Illinois House of Representatives
Party	Before	After	Change
Democratic	62	66	▲4
Republican	56	52	▼4
Total	118	118	

=== Indiana ===
All of the seats of the Indiana House of Representatives and half of the Indiana Senate were up for election. Republicans maintained control of the Senate while Democrats maintained control of the House of Representatives.

Indiana Senate
Party	Before	After	Change
Republican	32	32	Steady
Democratic	18	18	Steady
Total	50	50	

Indiana House of Representatives
Party	Before	After	Change
Democratic	53	51	▼2
Republican	47	49	▲2
Total	100	100	

=== Iowa ===
All of the seats of the Iowa House of Representatives and half of the Iowa Senate were up for election. Republicans maintained control of both legislative chambers.

Iowa Senate
Party	Before	After	Change
Republican	29	29	Steady
Democratic	21	21	Steady
Total	50	50	

Iowa House of Representatives
Party	Before	After	Change
Republican	56	54	▼2
Democratic	44	46	▲2
Total	100	100	

=== Kansas ===
All of the seats of the Kansas House of Representatives were up for election. Republicans maintained control.

Kansas House of Representatives
Party	Before	After	Change
Republican	79	80	▲1
Democratic	46	45	▼1
Total	125	125	

=== Kentucky ===
All of the seats of the Kentucky House of Representatives and half of the Kentucky Senate were up for election. Republicans maintained control of the Senate and Democrats maintained control of the House of Representatives.

Kentucky Senate
Party	Before	After	Change
Republican	20	21	▲1
Democratic	18	17	▼1
Total	38	38	

Kentucky House of Representatives
Party	Before	After	Change
Democratic	64	65	▲1
Republican	36	35	▼1
Total	100	100	

=== Maine ===
All of the seats of the Maine Legislature were up for election. Democrats maintained control of the House and won control of the Senate.

Maine Senate
Party	Before	After	Change
Democratic	17	18	▲1
Republican	17	17	Steady
Independent	1	0	▼1
Total	35	35	

Maine House of Representatives
Party	Before	After	Change
Democratic	88	80	▼8
Republican	62	67	▲5
Independent	1	3	▲2
Green	0	1	▲1
Total	151	151	

=== Maryland ===
All of the seats of the Maryland General Assembly were up for election. Democrats maintained control of both state legislative chambers.

Maryland Senate
Party	Before	After	Change
Democratic	34	33	▼1
Republican	13	14	▲1
Total	47	47	

Maryland House of Delegates
Party	Before	After	Change
Democratic	106	98	▼8
Republican	35	43	▲8
Total	160	160	

=== Massachusetts ===
All of the seats of the Massachusetts Legislature were up for election. Democrats maintained control of both state legislative chambers.

Massachusetts Senate
Party	Before	After	Change
Democratic	34	34	Steady
Republican	6	6	Steady
Total	40	40	

Massachusetts House of Representatives
Party	Before	After	Change
Democratic	137	135	▼2
Republican	23	23	Steady
Independent	0	1	▲1
Total	160	160	

=== Michigan ===
All of the seats of the Michigan legislature were up for election. Republicans maintained control of both chambers.

Michigan Senate
Party	Before	After	Change
Republican	23	22	▼1
Democratic	15	16	▲1
Total	38	38	

Michigan House of Representatives
Party	Before	After	Change
Republican	58	63	▲5
Democratic	52	47	▼5
Total	110	110	

=== Minnesota ===
All of the seats of the Minnesota Legislature were up. Republicans maintained control the House while Democrats maintained control of the Senate.

Minnesota Senate
Party	Before	After	Change
Democratic (DFL)	39	35	▼4
Republican	26	31	▲5
Independence	2	1	▼1
Total	67	67	

Minnesota House of Representatives
Party	Before	After	Change
Republican	71	82	▲11
Democratic (DFL)	63	52	▼11
Total	134	134	

=== Missouri ===
All of the seats of the Missouri House of Representatives and half of the Missouri Senate were up for election. Republicans maintained control of the Senate and won control of the House.

Missouri Senate
Party	Before	After	Change
Republican	18	20	▲2
Democratic	16	14	▼2
Total	34	34	

Missouri House of Representatives
Party	Before	After	Change
Republican	76	90	▲14
Democratic	87	73	▼14
Total	163	163	

=== Montana ===
All of the seats of the Montana House of Representatives and half of the Montana Senate were up for election. Republicans maintained control of both chambers.

Montana Senate
Party	Before	After	Change
Republican	31	29	▼2
Democratic	19	21	▲2
Total	50	50	

Montana House of Representatives
Party	Before	After	Change
Republican	58	53	▼5
Democratic	42	47	▲5
Total	100	100	

=== Nebraska ===
Nebraska is the only U.S. state with a unicameral legislature; half of the seats of the Nebraska Legislature were up for election. Nebraska is also unique in that its legislature is officially non-partisan and holds non-partisan elections, although the Democratic and Republican parties each endorse legislative candidates. Republicans maintained control.

Nebraska Legislature
Party	Before	After	Change
Republican	31	34	▲3
Democratic	16	13	▼3
Independent	2	2	Steady
Total	49	49	

=== Nevada ===
All of the seats of the Nevada House of Representatives and half of the Nevada Senate were up for election. Democrats maintained control of the House while Republicans maintained control of the Senate.

Nevada Senate
Party	Before	After	Change
Republican	12	13	▲1
Democratic	9	8	▼1
Total	21	21	

Nevada Assembly
Party	Before	After	Change
Democratic	27	23	▼4
Republican	15	19	▲4
Total	42	42	

=== New Hampshire ===
All of the seats of the New Hampshire House of Representatives and the New Hampshire Senate were up for election. Republicans maintained control of both chambers.

New Hampshire Senate
Party	Before	After	Change
Republican	13	18	▲5
Democratic	11	6	▼5
Total	24	24	

New Hampshire House of Representatives
Party	Before	After	Change
Republican	256	278	▲22
Democratic	144	122	▼22
Total	400	400	

=== New Mexico ===
All of the seats of the New Mexico House of Representatives were up for election; Democrats maintained control.

New Mexico House of Representatives
Party	Before	After	Change
Democratic	42	43	▲1
Republican	28	27	▼1
Total	70	70	

=== New York ===
All of the seats of the New York Legislature were up for election. Republicans maintained control of the Senate while Democrats maintained control of the Assembly.

New York State Senate
Party	Before	After	Change
Republican	36	37	▲1
Democratic	25	25	Steady
Total	61	62	▲1

New York State Assembly
Party	Before	After	Change
Democratic	98	102	▲4
Republican	52	48	▼4
Total	150	150	

=== North Carolina ===
All of the seats of the North Carolina House of Representatives and half of the North Carolina Senate were up for election. Democrats maintained control of the Senate. Republicans had won control of the House until a post-election party switch tied control of the chamber.

North Carolina Senate
Party	Before	After	Change
Democratic	35	28	▼7
Republican	15	22	▲7
Total	50	50	

North Carolina House of Representatives
Party	Before	After	Change
Democratic	62	60	▼2
Republican	58	60	▲2
Total	120	120	

=== North Dakota ===
All of the seats of the North Dakota House of Representatives and half of the North Dakota Senate were up for election. Republicans maintained control of both state legislative chambers.

North Dakota Senate
Party	Before	After	Change
Republican	32	31	▼1
Democratic-NPL	17	16	▼1
Total	49	47	▼2

North Dakota House of Representatives
Party	Before	After	Change
Republican	69	66	▼3
Democratic-NPL	29	28	▼1
Total	98	94	▼4

=== Ohio ===
All of the seats of the Ohio House of Representatives and half of the Ohio Senate were up for election. Republicans maintained control of both chambers.

Ohio Senate
Party	Before	After	Change
Republican	21	22	▲1
Democratic	12	11	▼1
Total	33	33	

Ohio House of Representatives
Party	Before	After	Change
Republican	60	62	▲2
Democratic	39	37	▼2
Total	99	99	

=== Oklahoma ===
All of the seats of the Oklahoma House of Representatives and half of the Oklahoma Senate were up for election. Democrats maintained control of both chambers.

Oklahoma Senate
Party	Before	After	Change
Democratic	30	28	▼2
Republican	18	20	▲2
Total	48	48	

Oklahoma House of Representatives
Party	Before	After	Change
Democratic	53	53	Steady
Republican	48	48	Steady
Total	101	101	

=== Oregon ===
All of the seats of the Oregon House of Representatives and half of the Oregon Senate were up for election. The Senate became split while Republicans maintained control of the House.

Oregon State Senate
Party	Before	After	Change
Republican	16	15	▼1
Democratic	14	15	▲1
Total	30	30	

Oregon House of Representatives
Party	Before	After	Change
Republican	32	35	▲3
Democratic	27	25	▼2
Independent	1	0	▼1
Total	60	60	

=== Pennsylvania ===
All of the seats of the Pennsylvania House of Representatives and half of the Pennsylvania Senate were up for election. Republicans maintained control of both chambers.

Pennsylvania State Senate
Party	Before	After	Change
Republican	29	29	Steady
Democratic	21	21	Steady
Total	50	50	

Pennsylvania House of Representatives
Party	Before	After	Change
Republican	106	110	▲4
Democratic	97	93	▼4
Total	203	203	

=== Rhode Island ===
All of the seats of the Rhode Island Legislature were up for election. Democrats maintained control of both state legislative chambers.

Rhode Island Senate
Party	Before	After	Change
Democratic	44	32	▼12
Republican	6	6	Steady
Total	50	38	▼12

Rhode Island House of Representatives
Party	Before	After	Change
Democratic	85	63	▼22
Republican	15	11	▼4
Independent	0	1	▲1
Total	100	75	▼25

=== South Carolina ===
All of the seats of the South Carolina House of Representatives were up for election. Republicans maintained control of the House.

South Carolina House of Representatives
Party	Before	After	Change
Republican	71	73	▲2
Democratic	53	51	▼2
Total	124	124	

=== South Dakota ===
All of the seats of the South Dakota Legislature were up for election. Republicans maintained control of both state legislative chambers.

South Dakota Senate
Party	Before	After	Change
Republican	24	26	▲2
Democratic	11	9	▼2
Total	35	35	

South Dakota House of Representatives
Party	Before	After	Change
Republican	50	49	▼1
Democratic	20	21	▲1
Total	70	70	

=== Tennessee ===
All of the seats of the Tennessee House of Representatives and half of the Tennessee Senate were up for election. Democrats maintained control of both chambers.

Tennessee Senate
Party	Before	After	Change
Democratic	18	18	Steady
Republican	15	15	Steady
Total	33	33	

Tennessee House of Representatives
Party	Before	After	Change
Democratic	58	54	▼4
Republican	41	45	▲4
Total	99	99	

=== Texas ===
All of the seats of the Texas Legislature were up for election. Aided by favorable redistricting, Republicans greatly expanded their majority in the Texas Senate and won control of the Texas House of Representatives for the first time since Reconstruction.

Texas Senate
Party	Before	After	Change
Republican	16	19	▲3
Democratic	15	12	▼3
Total	31	31	

Texas House of Representatives
Party	Before	After	Change
Republican	72	88	▲16
Democratic	78	62	▼16
Total	150	150	

=== Utah ===
All of the seats of the Utah House of Representatives and half of the Utah Senate were up for election. Republicans maintained control of both state legislative chambers.

Utah State Senate
Party	Before	After	Change
Republican	20	22	▲2
Democratic	9	7	▼2
Total	29	29	

Utah House of Representatives
Party	Before	After	Change
Republican	51	56	▲5
Democratic	24	19	▼5
Total	75	75	

=== Vermont ===
All of the seats of the Vermont Legislature were up for election. Democrats maintained control of the Senate while Republicans maintained control of the Senate.

Vermont Senate
Party	Before	After	Change
Democratic	16	19	▲3
Republican	14	11	▼3
Total	30	30	

Vermont House of Representatives
Party	Before	After	Change
Republican	82	73	▼9
Democratic	63	70	▲7
Progressive	4	4	Steady
Independent	1	3	▲2
Total	150	150	

=== Washington ===
All of the seats of the Washington House of Representatives and half of the Washington Senate were up for election. Republicans won control of the Senate while Democrats maintained control of the House.

Washington State Senate
Party	Before	After	Change
Republican	24	25	▲1
Democratic	25	24	▼1
Total	49	49	

Washington House of Representatives
Party	Before	After	Change
Democratic	50	52	▲2
Republican	48	46	▼2
Total	98	98	

=== West Virginia ===
All of the seats of the West Virginia House of Delegates and half of the West Virginia Senate were up for election. Democrats maintained control of both state legislative chambers.

West Virginia Senate
Party	Before	After	Change
Democratic	28	24	▼4
Republican	6	10	▲4
Total	34	34	

West Virginia House of Delegates
Party	Before	After	Change
Democratic	75	68	▼7
Republican	25	32	▲7
Total	100	100	

=== Wisconsin ===
All of the seats of the Wisconsin Assembly and half of the Wisconsin Senate were up for election. Republicans maintained control of the Assembly and won control of the House.

Wisconsin Senate
Party	Before	After	Change
Republican	15	18	▲3
Democratic	18	15	▼3
Total	33	33	

Wisconsin State Assembly
Party	Before	After	Change
Republican	56	58	▲2
Democratic	43	41	▼2
Total	99	99	

=== Wyoming ===
All of the seats of the Wyoming House of Representatives and half of the Wyoming Senate were up for election. Republicans maintained control of both state legislative chambers.

Wyoming Senate
Party	Before	After	Change
Republican	20	20	Steady
Democratic	10	10	Steady
Total	30	30	

Wyoming House of Representatives
Party	Before	After	Change
Republican	46	45	▼1
Democratic	14	15	▲1
Total	60	60	

== Territorial and federal district summaries ==
=== American Samoa ===
All of the seats of the American Samoa Senate and the American Samoa House of Representatives were up for election. Members of the Senate serve four-year terms, while members of the House of Representatives serve two-year terms. Gubernatorial and legislative elections are conducted on a nonpartisan basis in American Samoa.

=== Guam ===
All of the seats of the unicameral Legislature of Guam were up for election. All members of the legislature serve a two-year term. Republicans retained control of the legislature.

Guam Legislature
Party	Before	After	Change
Democratic	7	9	▲2
Republican	8	6	▼2
Total	15	15	

=== Washington, D.C. ===
The Council of the District of Columbia serves as the legislative branch of the federal district of Washington, D.C. Half of the council seats are up for election. Council members serve four-year terms. Democrats retained supermajority control of the council.

District of Columbia Council
Party	Before	After	Change
Democratic	11	11	Steady
Republican	2	2	Steady
Total	13	13	
