= Malaepule Moliga =

American Samoan politician

Member of the American Samoa Senate from the 2nd district
- Incumbent
- Assumed office January 3, 2021

Personal details
- Party: Nonpartisan

Malaepule Saite Moliga is an American Samoan politician. He served in the American Samoa Senate since 2021.
