= Tuiagamoa Tavai =

American Samoan politician

Member of the American Samoa Senate from the 9th district
- Incumbent
- Assumed office 2017

Personal details
- Party: Nonpartisan

Tuiagamoa Tavai is an American Samoan politician. He served in the American Samoa Senate since 2017.
