= Paul Stephenson =

Paul Stephenson may refer to:

- Paul Stephenson (footballer) (born 1968), British footballer
- Paul Stephenson (civil rights campaigner) (1937–2024), British civil rights campaigner
- Paul Stephenson (police officer) (born 1953), Metropolitan Police Commissioner, 2009–2011
- Paul Stephenson (rugby league) (born 1983), Australian rugby league footballer

== See also ==
- Paul Stevenson (disambiguation)
