= Elama Faʻatonu =

American Samoan sprinter and footballer

Personal information
- Born: April 30, 1994 (age 32) Faga'alu, American Samoa
- Height: 1.75 m (5 ft 9 in)
- Weight: 82 kg (181 lb)

Sport
- Country: American Samoa
- Sport: Athletics
- Event: 100 metres

Achievements and titles
- Personal best: 11.48 (London 2012)
- Updated on 15 August 2012

Elama Faʻatonu (born 30 April 1994) is an American Samoan sprinter. He competed in the 100 metres event at the 2012 Summer Olympics in London. He ranked 7th in his qualifying heat and failed to advance though he set a personal best time of 11.48 seconds.

== Football career ==
Fa'atonu played besides semi-professional as a striker for the FFAS Senior League club Utulei Youth, as well for the American Samoa national under-17 football team.
