= 1970 American Samoan referendum =

American Samoan ballot measure

A series of referendums on the legislature and taxes were held in American Samoa on 3 November 1970 alongside general elections. Voters were asked to approve a measure streamlining the spending of money obtained from taxes and duties, a ban on government employees or public officers running for the legislature while they held those positions, a measure setting the term of the Fono as two 30-day sessions per year and another capping MP salaries at six thousand dollars per year. All these measures passed and were adopted into law.
