= Olo Uluao Letuli =

American Samoan politician

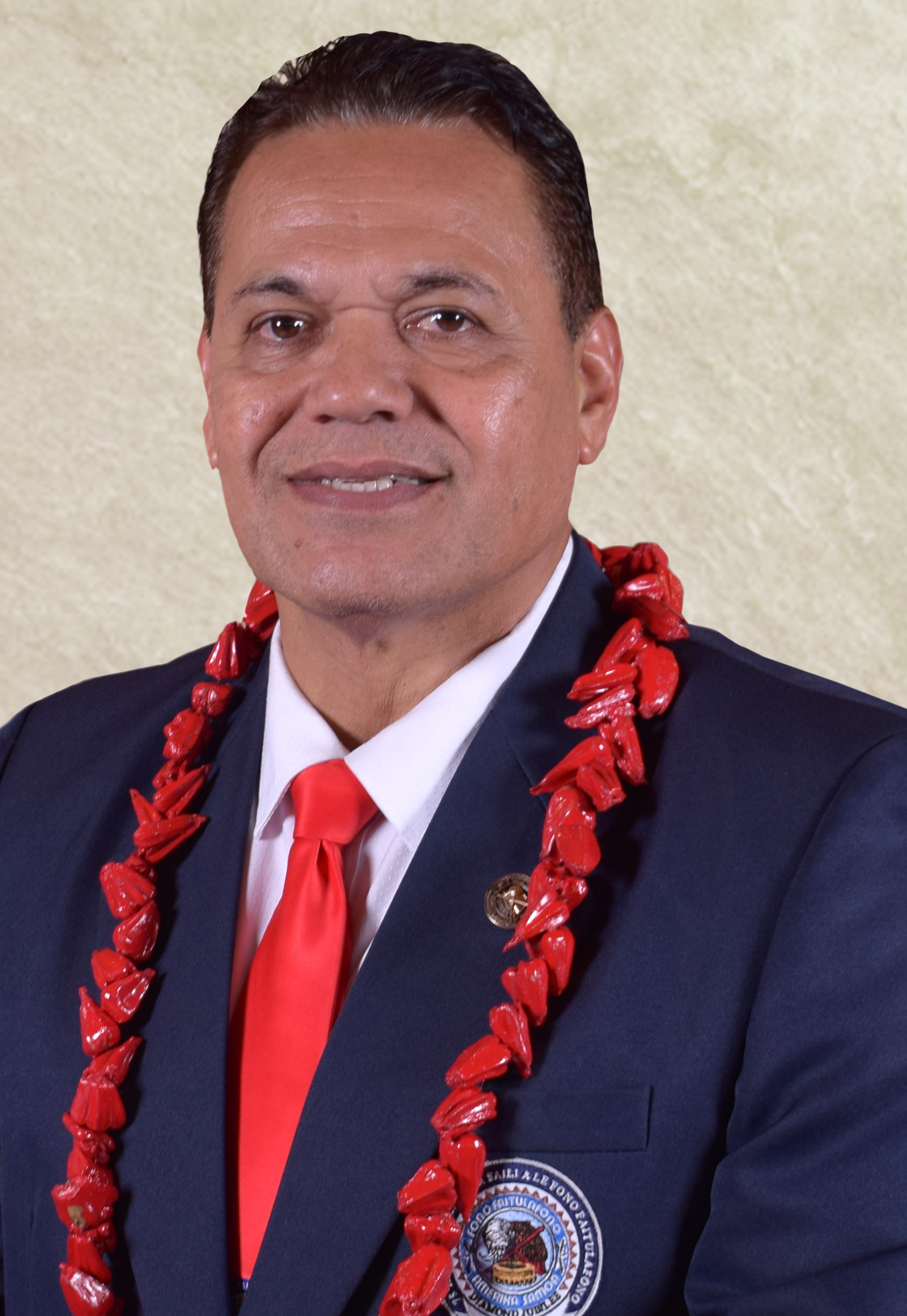

Member of the American Samoa Senate from the 11th district
- Incumbent
- Assumed office 2023
- Preceded by: Faiivae Iuli Alex Godinet

Personal details
- Party: Nonpartisan
- Spouse: Heavenly Annesley Letuli
- Children: 6

Olo Uluao Letuli is an American Samoan politician. He served in the American Samoa Senate since 2023.

== Military service ==
Letuli served in the United States Army for 30 years.
