= 1970 American Samoan general election =

General elections were held in American Samoa in November 1970, alongside a multi-question referendum. Voters elected members of the eleventh Fono, and for the first time, an unofficial American Samoan delegate to the United States House of Representatives. A. U. Fuimaono, a high chief and Director of Agriculture, was elected as the islands' delegate.

== Results ==
=== Senate ===
Member	Notes
Salanoa Aumoeualogo	President
Tuitasi Faamasani	
Mageo Felise	
John Faumuina	
Aufata Fonoti	
Lagafuaina Laisense	
Leoso Malama	
Satele Mosegi	
Aso'au Ofisa	
Leaeno Reed	
Sagapolutele T.N.	
Fano Shimasaki	
Tuveve Siaki Ameperosa	
Fofō Iosefa Fiti Sunia	
Mulitauaopele Tamotu	
Alaivanu Taufaasau	
Matauti'a Tautunu	
Tagaloa Tuiolosega	
Source: United States Congress

=== House of Representatives ===
Member	Notes
Solofua Amosa	
Ligoligo Eseroma	
Tofu Fia	
Talitalimanu Galea'i	
Tupua Le'iato	
Faasuku Lutu	
Sialega Mauga	
Edward Meredith	
Manutafea Meredith	
Soosooalii Savali	
Seugogo Schirmer	
Faamausili Suiaunoa	
Fuaileleo Sunia	
Vasi Talamoni	
Muagututi'a F. Tuia	
Mariota Tuiasosopo	
Lefotu Tuilesu	
Tagoa'i Tunoa	
Fainu'ulelei S. Utu	Speaker
John Valasi	
Source: United States Congress
