= Magalei Logovii =

American Samoan politician

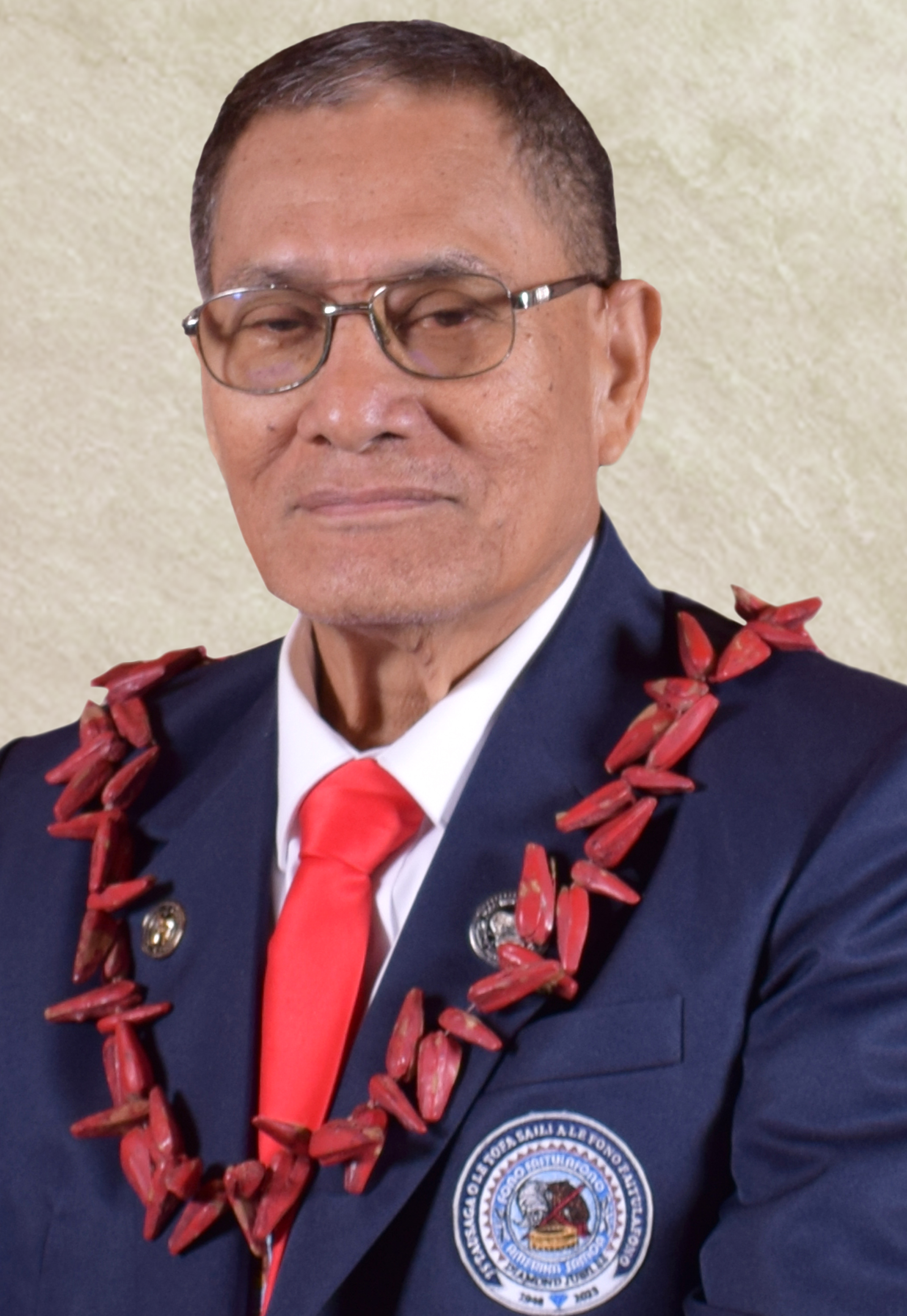

Member of the American Samoa Senate from the 8th district
- Incumbent
- Assumed office 2013

Personal details
- Party: Nonpartisan

Magalei Logovii is an American Samoan politician. He served in the American Samoa Senate since 2013.
