= Ponemafua Tapeni =

American Samoan politician

Member of the American Samoa Senate from the Alataua district
- In office 3 January 2021 – 3 January 2025
- Preceded by: Sauitufuga Pita Suiaunoa

Personal details
- Party: Nonpartisan

Ponemafua Tapeni is an American Samoan politician and member of the American Samoa Senate.

Tapeni was appointed to the Senate on December 3, 2020, and assumed office on January 3, 2021.
