= Anthony Liu (judoka) =

American Samoan judoka

Personal information
- Born: 6 June 1987
- Died: 25 March 2022 (aged 34)
- Occupation: Judoka

Sport
- Sport: Judo

Anthony Liu (6 June 1987 – 23 March 2022) was an American Samoan judoka. Liuw was born in Faga'alu and died in San Antonio, Texas on 23 March 2022. He qualified for the 2012 Summer Olympics Men's 100 kg competition where he lost in the round of 32 to Jevgeņijs Borodavko.
