= Soliai Tuipine Fuimaono =

American Samoan politician

Soliai T. Fuimaono

Member of the American Samoa Senate from the 7th district
- In office 1985–1994
- Incumbent
- Assumed office January 3, 2021

Personal details
- Born: August 27, 1938 (age 86)
- Political party: Nonpartisan

Soliai Tuipine Fuimaono (born August 27, 1938) is an American Samoan politician. He has served as a member of the American Samoa Senate for the 7th district, both from 1985 to 1994 and since 2021. He served as Guam's Chief Elections Officer from the 1990s to the 2010s.
