= LBJ Tropical Medical Center =

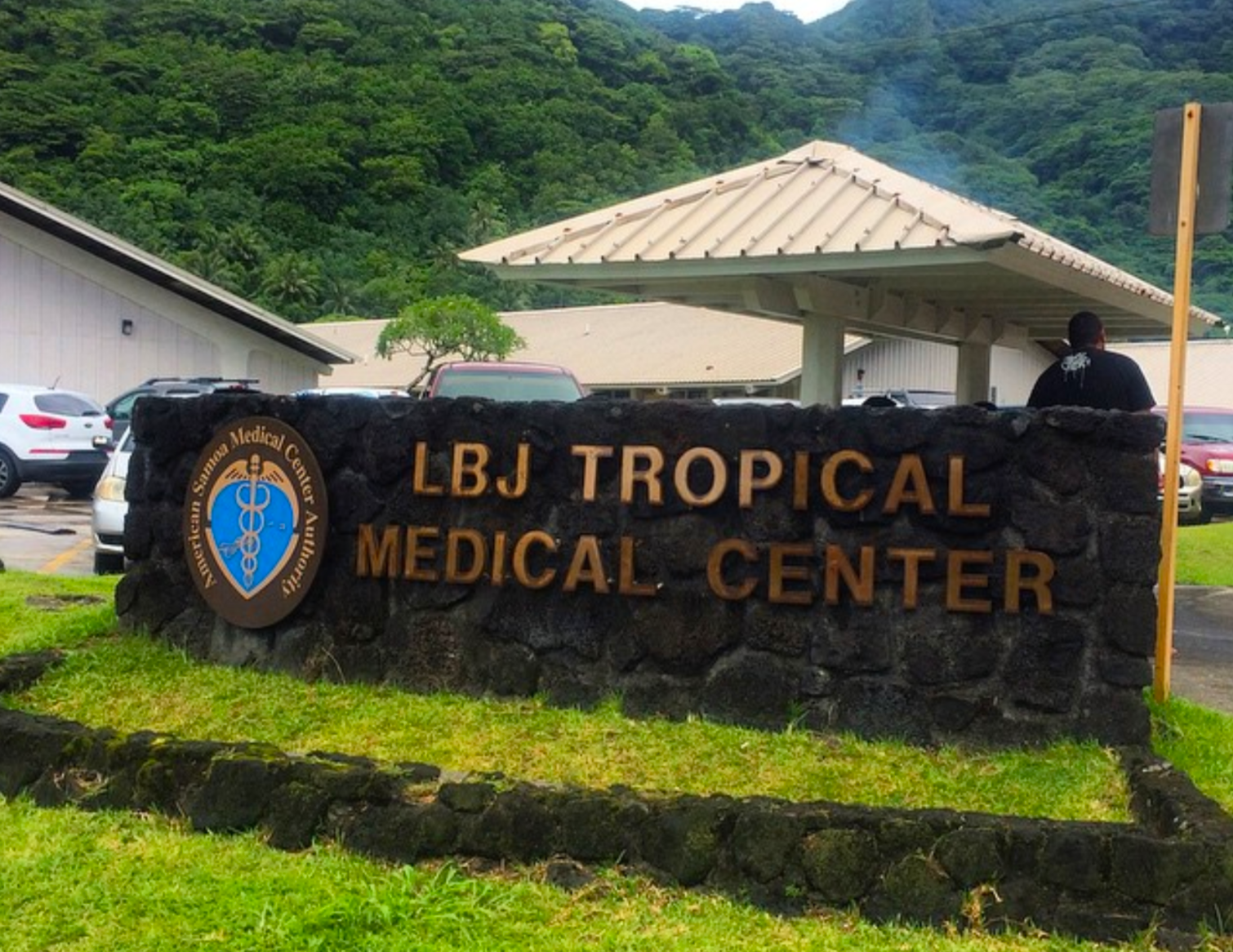

Geography
- Location: Faga'alu, Maoputasi County, American Samoa
- Coordinates: 14.2903°S 170.6855°W

Organisation
- Type: District General

Services
- Emergency department: Yes
- Beds: 150

History
- Opened: June 6, 1968

Links
- Website: lbjtmc.org
- Lists: Hospitals in American Samoa

Lyndon B. Johnson Tropical Medical Center is the rural general hospital in Faga'alu, Maoputasi County, American Samoa, and is the only public hospital located in the territory. It has been ranked among the best hospitals in the Pacific Ocean. It is home to an emergency room and there are doctors on duty at all hours. It is a 150-bed facility. It includes TB, leprosy and obstetric units. The hospital was built in 1968 and is operating under a $50 million budget as of 2017. The executive director is Taufete'e John Faumuina.

== History ==
The government condemned nearly 20 acres (8.1 ha) for a new hospital in Faga'alu Valley in the 1960s. The total estimated cost of the project was $3.5 million. The Lyndon Baines Johnson (LBJ) Tropical Medical Center opened on June 6, 1968. The first admitted patient was a baby about to be delivered. He received the name Lyndon. Soon after its start, the hospital was acclaimed to be the best medical facility in the region. The opening staff consisted of 300 locals and a small cadre of stateside professionals. A U.S. government record stated that in 1969 the number of employees, two doctors and one dentist, "was dangerously low" but that since then more doctors were hired.

A 1971 study found the hospital services offered at LBJ to be compared favorably with services offered in the mainland at health care facilities of comparable size. The government began sending more students for training in New Zealand and Fiji, and nurses for RN training in Hawai'i. New programs in the 1970s offered maternal and child health education, health statistics, chronic and communicable disease control, filariasis control, and mental health. In 1978, the Maternal Child Health and Crippled Children Services were introduced. Renal dialysis equipment arrived and a special unit was organized. It soon became one of the most valuable additions to local healing services as kidney diseases increased. Women's Auxiliary later emerged and provided equipment and other forms of assistance to medical and nursing staff.

On August 23, 1982, the hospital announced new changes to the prices: in-patient, $20 per day; out-patient, $2 per visit; for uninsured patients: in-patient, $201 per day; out-patient, $5.70 per visit. Director of Health Dr. Nofo Siliga claimed the revenues were needed in order to pay for improvements, purchase better equipment, and hire more physicians. The negative reaction was immediate and the Legislature held meetings regarding hospital prices. The Cancer Society joined LBJ in a breast cancer awareness campaign. In October 1983, an updating of the major indicators of territorial health status showed significant improvement in every major area. American Samoans were living longer than ever before, premature deaths were lower, and there was a significant reduction in the incidence of several important preventable diseases. The mortality rate was the lowest of all five inhabited U.S. territories.

Circa 1993 U.S. Senator Daniel Inouye criticized the conditions at LBJ.

In 2013, the LDS Church donated a digital mammography and biopsy machine to the hospital.

In September 2019, it was reported in Samoa News that hospital CEO Faumuina John Faumuina had informed local lawmakers of challenges with recruiting Samoan doctors and nurses. The hospital's proposed budget for the fiscal year 2020 totaled $50.78 million, which is a $68,500 decrease from the approved FY 2019 budget. As of September 2019, LBJ's debt was about $5 million. Its largest revenue sources as of 2019 were $16 million from Medicaid, $8 million in subsidies from the U.S. Department of the Interior, and $10 million from Medicare.

In October 2019, the hospital performed its first knee replacement surgery with help from the Church of Latter Day Saints (LDS), which contributed specialized equipment valued at around $800,000 USD and provided training for local doctors.
