= Fano Mitch Shimasaki =

American Samoan politician

Member of the American Samoa Senate from the Maʻopūtasi County district
- Incumbent
- Assumed office 3 January 2017

Fano Frank Mitchell Shimasaki is an American Samoan politician and member of the American Samoa Senate.

Fano is president of the Faga’alu Green Bay Soccer Club. Since 2011 he has been a member of the executive of Football Federation American Samoa.

Fano was first elected to the Senate in November 2016. He was re-elected in 2020.

In March 2022 he was appointed as a member of the American Samoa Statistical Advisory Council.
