= Paul Stevenson (politician) =

American Samoan politician

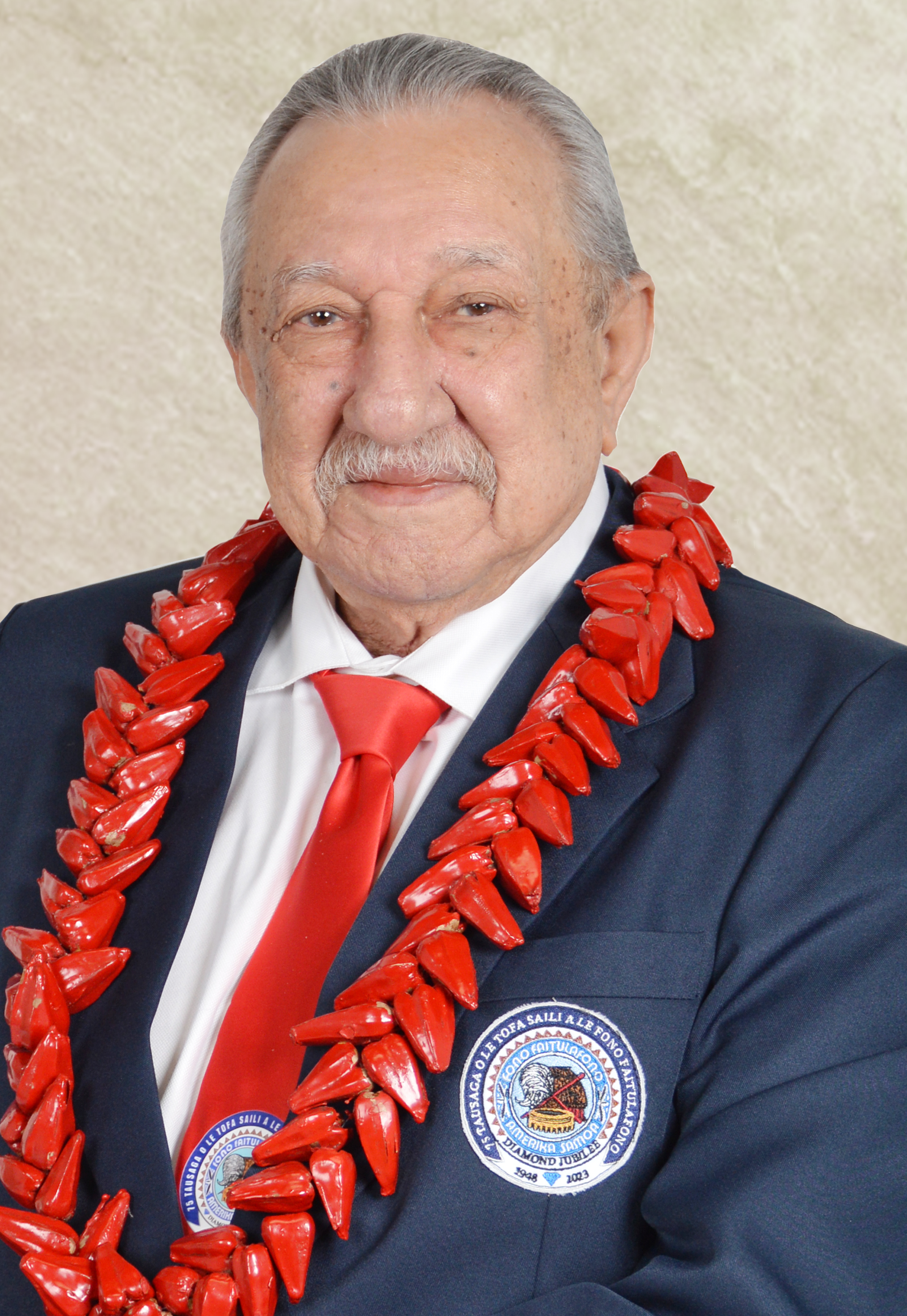

Member of the American Samoa Senate from the 7th district
- Incumbent
- Assumed office January 3, 2021

Personal details
- Party: Nonpartisan

Alo Paul Stevenson is an American Samoan politician. He served in the American Samoa Senate since 2021.
