= Fagaʻalu, American Samoa =

Fagaʻalu Faalu
- Village
- Location within American Samoa
- Coordinates: 14°17′47″S 170°41′1″W
- Country: United States
- Territory: American Samoa
- County: Maoputasi

Area
  - Total: 0.41 sq mi (1.07 km^{2})

Population (2020)
  - Total: 731
  - Density: 1,770/sq mi (683/km^{2})

Fagaʻalu is a village in central Tutuila Island, American Samoa. It is also known as Fagaʻalo. It is located on the eastern shore of Pago Pago Harbor, to the south of Pago Pago. American Samoa's lone hospital, Lyndon B. Johnson Tropical Medical Center, is located in Fagaʻalu. The village is centered around Fagaalu Stream.

Fagaʻalu has been named one of the best places to surf in American Samoa. It is one of thirteen villages in American Samoa that have been declared Marine Protected Areas.

== History ==
In April 1941, members of the 7th Battalion showed up in villages throughout Tutuila Island. Later that month, the battalion cleared large jungle areas and began on the construction of the Camp Samuel Nicholas in Fagaʻalu. During World War II, the U.S. military established facilities in Faga'alu, including a telephone exchange and a warehouse complex that monitored the entrance to Pago Pago Harbor. This expansive complex featured over 50 buildings, such as a U.S. Marine camp, multiple warehouses and truck sheds, a large mess hall, shower facilities, a tailor shop, and a post exchange. The telephone exchange was situated underground in the far northwestern corner of the installation and was accessed via a short tramway.

== Geography ==
Fagaʻalu Bay is located between Niuloa Point in the south and Tulutulu Point in the north. The bay is considered a part of "outer Pago Pago Harbor." The main drainage in the Fagaʻalu watershed is the Fagaʻalu Stream and its 8 tributaries. The stream is known as Matafao Stream in the drainage's upper reaches near Mount Matafao. Smaller drainages are situated on the southeast and northeast sides of the village. Matafao Stream begins at around the 1,400 feet (430 m) contour and continues downslopes to a stream fall. It becomes Fagaʻalu Stream at around 500 feet (150 m) above sea level. It discharges into the Pacific Ocean in Fagaʻalu Bay. Gobie fish, Mountain bass, and Freshwater eel have been observed in Fagaʻalu Stream. Fagaʻalu Bay is a calm bay with a cricket field, boat ramp, and basketball and volleyball courts.

Most of Fagaʻalu is located at elevations well above potential tsunami elevations, and also set back a considerable distance from the ocean.

In the central parts of Fagaʻalu is a road turning north to LBJ Hospital and other medical facilities. At the end of this road are the waterfalls Fagaʻalu Falls. Fagaʻalu Bay is one of the best snorkeling spots on the island with its coral heads and reef formations, and sea life such as turtles and reef sharks.

=== Whale Rock ===
Whale Rock is a coral formation located in Fagaʻalu. It lies in the middle of the channel inside the entrance to Pago Pago Harbor. The formation is approximately 100 feet (30 meters) in diameter and is submerged under 16 feet (5 meters) of water. During bad weather, waves break over Whale Rock, making it more noticeable due to the surf. In calm conditions, it is easily seen beneath the water's surface.

== Economy ==
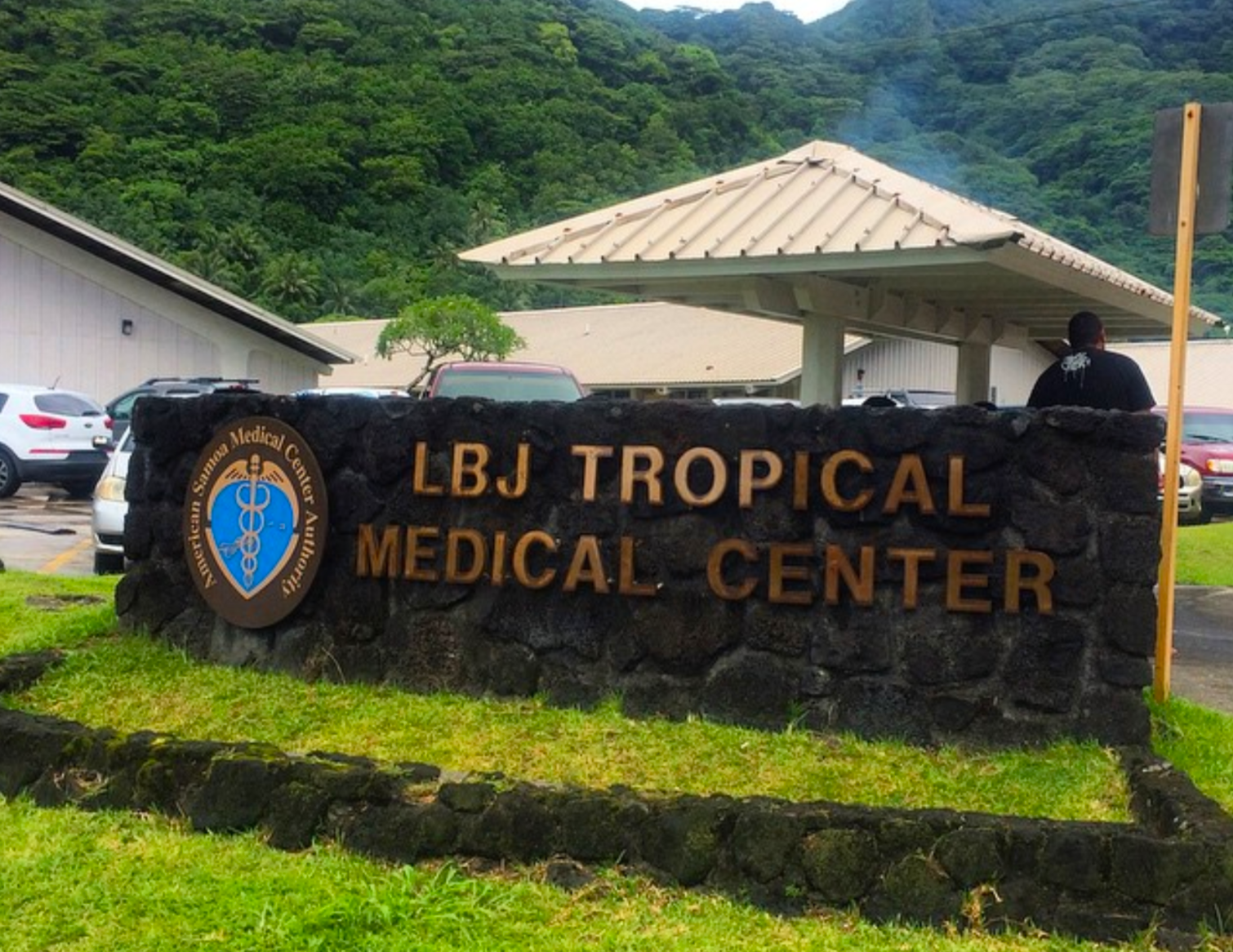

There were 53 commercial business enterprises found in the village as of 2000. Several of these are located along the shoreline road and Dr Jim Turner Rd. Businesses include two bakeries, grocery stores, retail shops, and a laundromat. A quarry operation is located between the 100-foot (30 m)-125-foot (38 m) contour at the west end of Fagaʻalu. It is operated and owned by Samoa Maritime. As of 2000, the Samoa Maritime Quarry generated around 500 cubic yards (380 m^{3}) of reject material per week.

The LBJ Hospital complex consumes 7 acres (2.8 ha). The location of the hospital is a former marsh which was filled in the early 1960s in order to accommodate the hospital.

=== LBJ Tropical Medical Center ===
Lyndon B. Johnson Tropical Medical Center is the only hospital in American Samoa and the only prescription pharmacy on the island. It has been ranked among the best hospitals in the Pacific Ocean. It is home to an emergency room and there are doctors on duty at all hours.

== Tourism ==
Fagaʻalu is home to Virgin Falls, which is a tourist destination on the island. A 0.6-mile (0.97 km) hike past the LBJ Tropical Medical Center leads to a small rock quarry. From there, a trail climbs past a series of waterfalls, known as Virgin Falls. Several of the waterfalls have pools used for swimming.

Fagaʻalu is home to Le Fale Pule Lodge, which sits high up on a hillside above Matafao Elementary School in Fagaʻalu. The hotel offers panoramic views of Pago Pago Harbor, and is located 300 feet (91 m) above sea level. Four of the rooms are in the main house, while there's also a separate cottage with outdoor Jacuzzis.

In 1972, the Bureau of Outdoor Recreation approved a project to develop a park in Fagaʻalu Bay. Fagaʻalu Park is located at the outer part of Pago Pago Harbor and is a grassy park with picnic tables and a white-sand beach. A boat ramp has been constructed at Fagaʻalu Park on government-owned land administrated by the Department of Parks and Recreation. The construction was initiated after the former public boat ramps at Fagasa and Pago Pago were damaged from the 2009 tsunami. The park is used for recreational activities such as picnicking, swimming, fishing, and camping.

On Tutuila Island, the majority of sea turtle sightings take place in Fagaʻalu Park, Lion's Park in Tafuna, and Gataivai (in Pago Pago Harbor).

== Demographics ==
Year	Population
2020	731
2010	910
2000	1,006
1990	1,006
1980	757
1970	900
1960	531
1950	395
1940	197
1930	106

As of the early 1980s, 21 percent of Fagaʻalu residents were born abroad. By 1990, 42 percent of residents were born outside of American Samoa. As of the 1990 U.S. census, the village was home to 153 houses. Historically, residential development has taken place along the south and north sides of Fagaʻalu Stream. Another residential area is found upland of Fagaʻalu Park along the shoreline road and adjoining steeper slopes.

== Notable residents ==
- Elama Faʻatonu – Olympic sprinter for the American Samoa
- Anthony Liu – Olympic judoka
- Leonard Peters – former football safety and current rugby union player
- Junior Sifa – American rugby union player
- Kaino Thomsen-Fuataga – Samoan Olympic taekwondo practitioner
- Nathaniel Tuamoheloa – Olympic wrestler for ASA
- Ching Maou Wei – Olympic swimmer
- Jerome Kaino – New Zealand rugby union player (born in Fagaʻalu; raised in Auckland, New Zealand)
- A. U. Fuimaono – politician
- Tai Enosa – rugby player
- Vincent Smith Ho Ching – founder of the Tutuila's first school for individuals with disabilities, Fautasi racing crew member, and representative for American Sāmoa at the South Pacific Festival of Arts.
