= American Samoa Senate =

Upper house of the American Samoa Fono

Coordinates: 14.2782°S 170.6890°W

- American Samoa Fono

Type
- Type: Upper house
- Term limits: None

History
- Founded: October 26, 1948

Leadership
- President: Tuaolo Fruean (I) since January 8, 2021

Structure
- Seats: 18
- Political groups: Non-partisan (18)
- Length of term: 4 years
- Salary: $25,000/year

Website
- www.americansamoa.gov/fono

The American Samoa Senate is the upper house of the American Samoa Fono. The Senate, like the lower House of Representatives, is a nonpartisan body. It is composed of 18 senators, serving a four-year term.

The first name for the upper house of the legislature was Atoa o Aliʻi (“Assembly of Paramount Aliʻis”) when established in 1948. It was replaced with the current American Samoa Senate in 1953.

== History ==
American Samoa became a United States territory in 1900 and was initially administered by the Navy. From 1905, annual meetings were held with delegates sent from the local communities, as an advisory council to the naval governor.

In 1948, a bicameral legislature was established, still in advisory capacity. The upper house, named the House of Ali‘i, was composed of 12 members, being the seven high chiefs of Tutuila and the five high chiefs of Manu‘a. This legislature was reformed in 1952, after administration of American Samoa had been transferred to the Department of the Interior. Members of the House of Ali‘i became advisors to the governor, while a new upper house, named the Senate, was established. There were 15 senators, five from each of the three districts of American Samoa (Western, Eastern and Manu‘a). Senators were elected in open meetings, according to Samoan custom, and had to be holders of a matai title.

In 1960, the first constitution of American Samoa was adopted. The Senate became composed of 15 members: one from each of the then 14 counties, elected for four-year terms, and an additional senator rotating from the then four counties of the Western District, elected for two-year terms. In 1967, the revised constitution modified the Senate to 18 members, all elected for four-year terms: two from the combined counties of Ta‘ū island; one from the combined counties of Ofu-Olosega; three from Ma‘oputasi county; two each from Sua, Itu‘au and Tualauta counties; and one from each of the six remaining counties. Under both constitutions, senators are elected according to Samoan custom by the county councils and must be holders of a matai title.

Fano Solinuu Shimasaki was the first woman to serve in the American Samoa Senate.

== List of senators ==
As of 2024, the members of the American Samoa Senate are:

District	Counties	Name	Start	Party
1	Taʻū; Faleāsao; Fitiʻuta	Ma'o Faauma Gogo	2021	Independent
1	Taʻū; Faleāsao; Fitiʻuta	Poumele A. P. Galea'i	2023	Independent
2	Ofu; Olosega	Malaepule Moliga	2021	Independent
3	Saʻole	Utu Sila Poasa	2021	Independent
4	Vaifanua	Satele Aliitai Lili'o	2021	Independent
5	Suʻa	Muagututiʻa Moevasa Tauoa	2017	Independent
5	Suʻa	Togiola Tulafono	2021	Democratic
6	Maʻopūtasi	Tuaolo Manaia Fruean	2015	Independent
6	Maʻopūtasi	Fano Mitch Shimasaki	2017	Independent
6	Maʻopūtasi	Uti Petelo	2020	Independent
7	Itūʻau	Paul Stevenson	2021	Independent
7	Itūʻau	Soliai Tuipine Fuimaono	2021	Independent
8	Tuālāuta	Magalei Logovii	2013	Independent
8	Tuālāuta	Fonoti Tafa'ifa Aufata	2021	Independent
9	Leasina	Tuiagamoa Tavai	2017	Independent
10	Tualatai	Tuiasina Salamo Laumoli	2023	Independent
11	Fofo	Olo Uluao Letuli	2023	Independent
12	Lealataua	Ponemafua Tapeni	2021	Independent

== Voting ==
The American Samoa Senate is the only legislature of its kind in the entire United States, both state and territorial, that is not directly elected by the voting population. Instead, the Senate's voting franchise is strictly limited to the various chiefs of the islands.
