= Keith Hunter =

Keith Hunter may refer to:

- Keith Hunter (chemist) (1951–2018), New Zealand ocean chemist
- Keith Hunter (politician), English police officer and politician

== See also ==
- Keith Hunter Jesperson (born 1955), Canadian-American serial killer
