= 1988 Special Honours (New Zealand) =

Awards list for New Zealand

The 1988 Special Honours in New Zealand was a Special Honours Lists, dated 6 February 1988, making the second five appointments to the Order of New Zealand.

== Order of New Zealand (ONZ) ==
Ordinary member

- June Daphne, Lady Blundell QSO.
- Walter James Knox JP.
- Emeritus Professor Douglas Gordon Lilburn
- Professor Richard Ellis Ford Matthews.
- Frederick Turnovsky OBE.
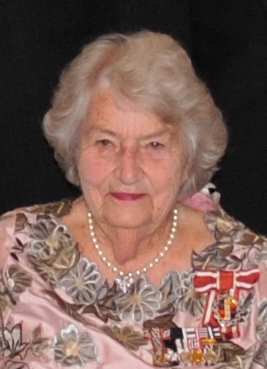
June, Lady Blundell

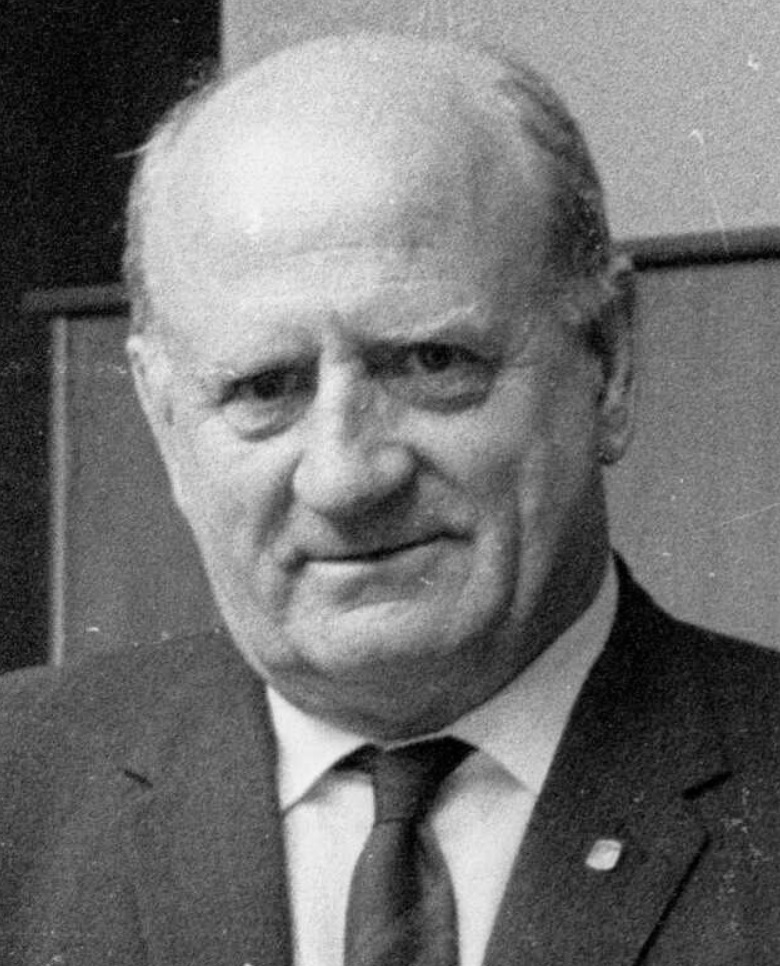
Jim Knox

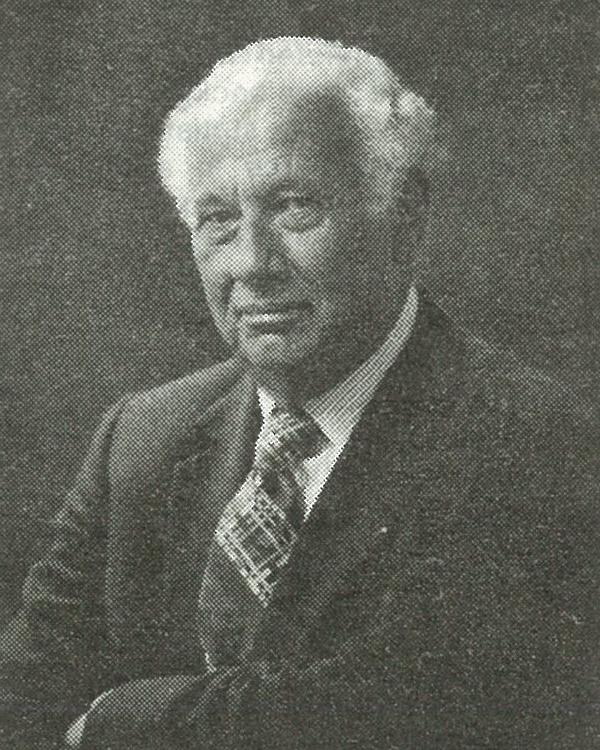
Frederick Turnovsky
