= 2022 Special Honours (New Zealand) =

- Previous: 2022 Queen's Birthday and Platinum Jubilee Honours; Next: 2022 bravery awards
- Type: New Zealand royal honours: New Zealand Order of Merit
- Date: 9 June 2022
- Country: New Zealand

Highlights
- Total recipients: 1

The 2022 Special Honours in New Zealand was a special honours list, dated 9 June 2002 and published in New Zealand on 14 June 2022. The actor, Sam Neill, was redesignated from Distinguished Companion to Knight Companion of the New Zealand Order of Merit. He had previously declined redesignation when titular honours were reintroduced by the New Zealand government in 2009.

== New Zealand Order of Merit ==
=== Knight Companion (KNZM) ===
Redesignation

- Nigel John Dermot (Sam) Neill DCNZM OBE – of Queenstown. Appointed a Distinguished Companion of the New Zealand Order of Merit on 30 December 2006.
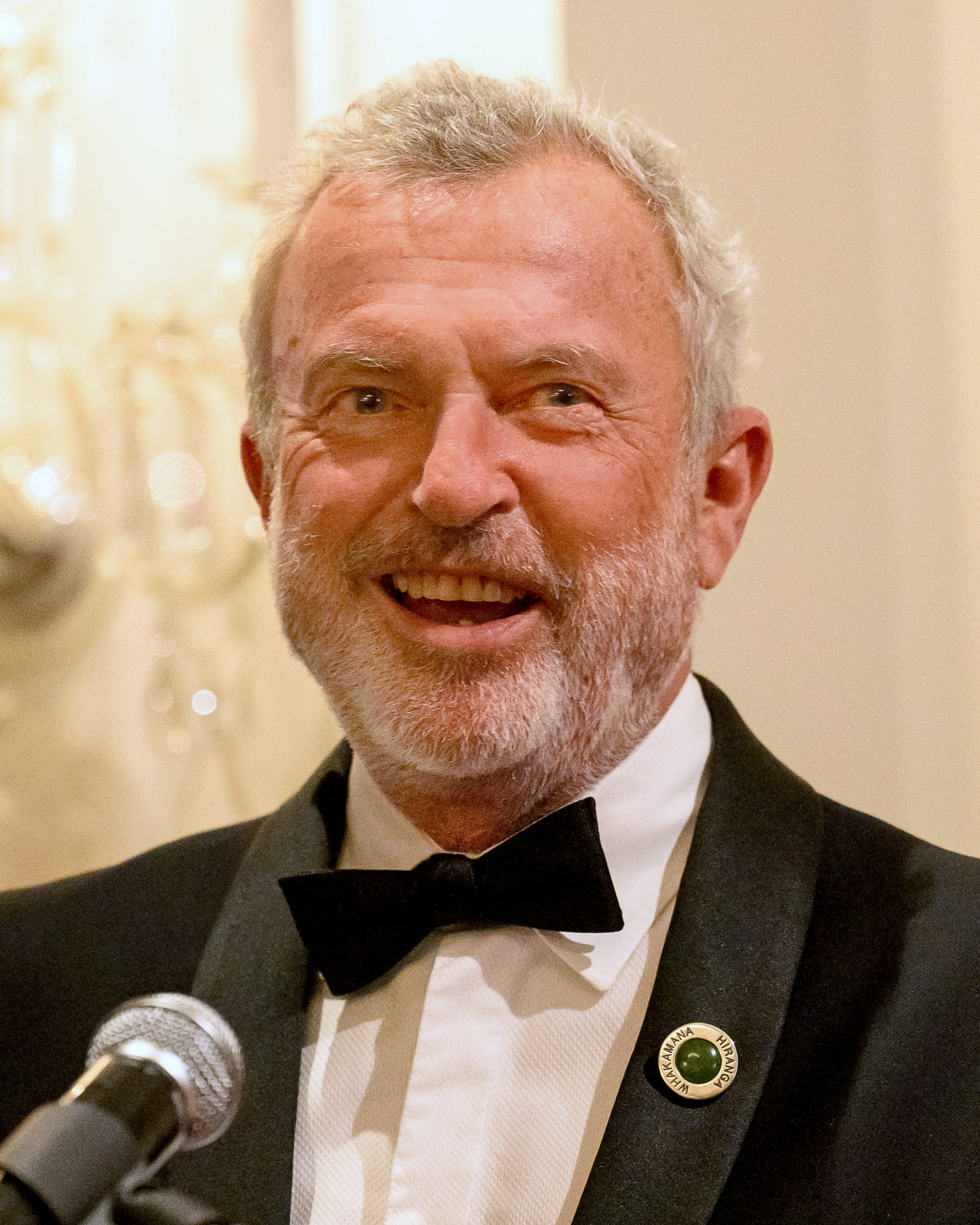
Sir Sam Neill
