= Abigail Smith (disambiguation) =

Abigail Smith (fl. 1990s–2010s) is a New Zealand professor of marine science.

Abigail Smith or Abby Smith may also refer to:

- Abigail Adams Smith (1765–1813), daughter of U.S. president John Adams
- Abby Hadassah Smith (1797–1879), American suffragist
- Abby Smith (born 1993), American soccer player
