= Abbie Smith =

Abbie Smith, or variations, may refer to:

== Abby ==
- Abby Smith (born 1993), American footballer
- Abby Hadassah Smith (1797–1879), early American suffragist

== Abigail ==
- Abigail Smith, professor of marine science, University of Otago
- Abigail Adams Smith (1765–1813), daughter of American president John Adams
- Abigail Willis Tenney Smith (1809-1885), American missionary to the Hawaiian Islands

== Other variants ==
- Abbe Smith (born 1956), American attorney and professor
- Abbey Smith (Misfits)
- Abi Smith (born 2002), British international cyclist
- Abbie Smith, Utah rep in Miss USA 2002

== See also ==
- Abigail Smith Adams, wife of American president John Adams
