= Joseph Churchward =

Samoan-New Zealand graphic designer and typesetter

Joseph Churchward QSM
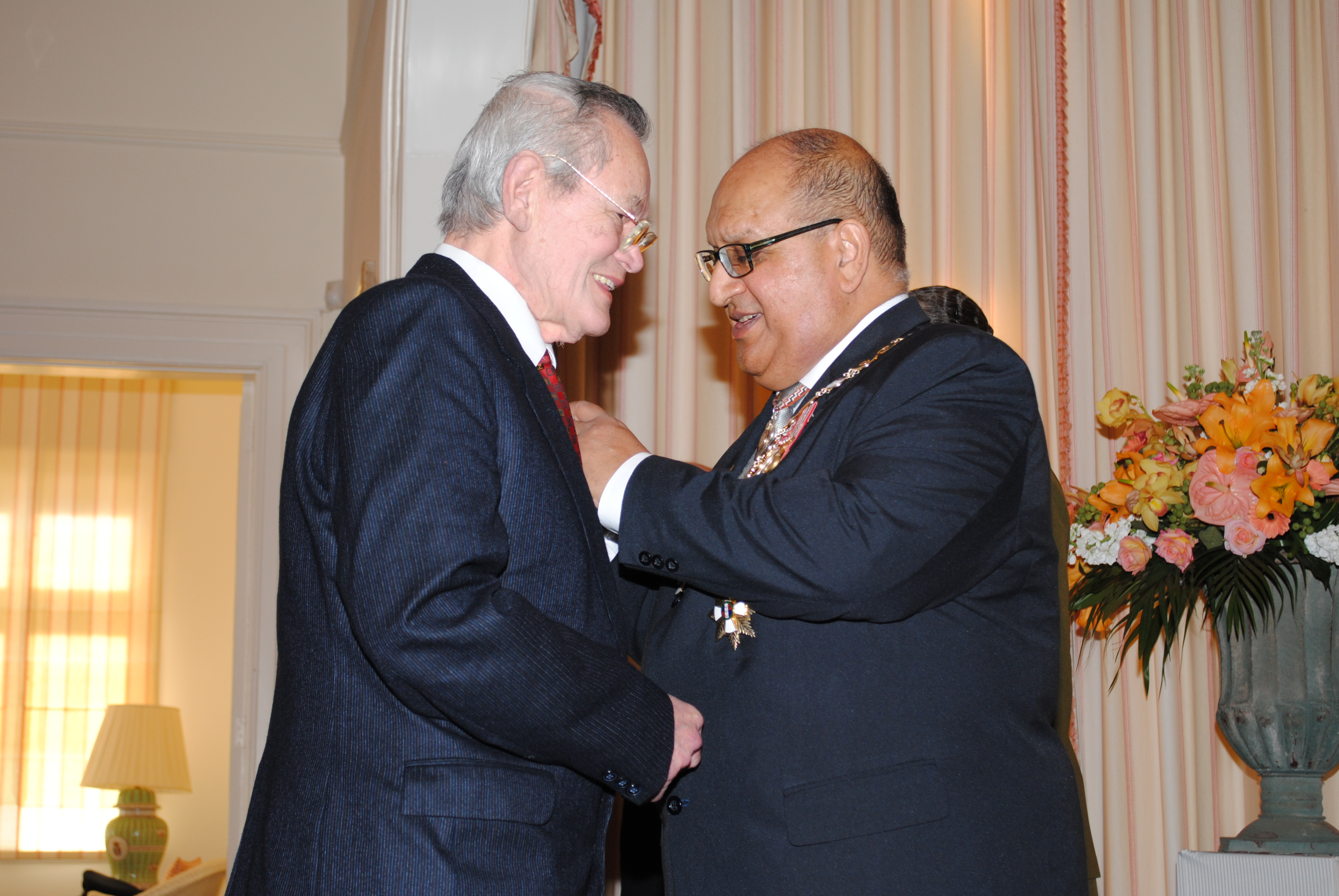
- Churchward receives the Queen's Service Medal from Governor-General Sir Anand Satyanand in 2010
- Born: 20 August 1932; Apia, Samoa
- Died: 26 April 2013 (aged 80); Wellington, New Zealand
- Occupations: Graphic designer and typographer

Joseph Churchward QSM (20 August 1932 – 26 April 2013) was a Samoan-born New Zealand graphic designer and typographer. He is known for having designed an estimated 690 original typefaces, many of which are in use around the world. His designs were also used in the masthead of The Evening Post newspaper.

Churchward was born in Apia, Samoa, of Samoan, English, Scottish, Tongan and Chinese heritage. He came from the 'aiga (family) Sā Anae, and the villages of Faleasiu and Tufulele. Historian Safua Akelei Amaama writes, "Churchward's childhood memories of drawing letters in the sand in Sāmoa inspired his practice". Churchward moved to New Zealand in 1946 to study at Miramar South School in Wellington. In 1948, he obtained an Art Distinction Award in Lettering from Wellington Technical College and began a career as a commercial artist.

He founded Churchward International Typefaces in 1969, eventually New Zealand's largest typesetting firm. In 1970 Churchward entered an agreement with German company Berthold Fototype, who subsequently distributed his fonts throughout the world. Over the span of his career, Churchward created more than 600 original typefaces. In 2008, a special exhibition was set up for his art at the Museum of New Zealand Te Papa Tongarewa, which also hold his archive and collection.

He was awarded the Queen's Service Medal in the 2010 Queen's Birthday Honours, for services to typography.

He died on 26 April 2013 in Wellington from bowel cancer.

== In popular culture ==
In 2025, Churchward's typeface Churchward Roundsquare was prominently featured in the Yorgos Lanthimos film Bugonia, starring Emma Stone. The film's graphic designer, Vasilis Marmatakis, discovered a specimen of the typeface in the archives of the Museum of New Zealand Te Papa Tongarewa, and received permission from Churchward's daughter to create a digitisation for the film's title card, posters, and credits. Marmatakis described the typeface as feeling "monumental yet sharp, even a little threatening" and "futuristic, but in a very analogue way." In the film's credits, only the middle letter of each name is set in Churchward Roundsquare, with the remainder in Adobe Garamond; the letters were printed, brushed with water to create subtle imperfections, and then scanned back in as part of Marmatakis's analogue design process. The typeface's use in the film brought renewed international attention to Churchward's body of work.
