= Gay Eaton =

New Zealand textile artist

Gaynor Mary Eaton MNZM (10 April 1933 – 8 July 2017) was a New Zealand textile artist. Pieces of her work are held in the permanent collection of Otago Museum in Dunedin.

Eaton was the president of the Otago Embroiderers' Guild and also served as a regional education officer for the Association of New Zealand Embroiderers' Guilds. As part of this role, she taught embroidery at St Hilda’s Collegiate School, Dunedin. In 1984, she proposed an annual embroidery school be run at Wānaka, Otago; the school started in 1985 and has run every year since. Eaton chaired the organising committee for 25 years, and in 2014 an exhibition of her work was presented at the event.

Eaton was appointed a Member of the Order of New Zealand in the 2007 New Year's Honours, for services to embroidery.
