= Feaunati =

Feaunati or Fe'aunati is a surname. Notable people with the surname include:

- Carinnya Feaunati (fl. 2010), New Zealand Samoan architect
- Dominic Fe'aunati (born 1978), Samoan rugby player
- Isaac Fe'aunati (born 1973), Samoan rugby player
