= Miriam Dell =

New Zealand women's advocate (1924–2022)

Dame Miriam Dell ONZ DBE JP
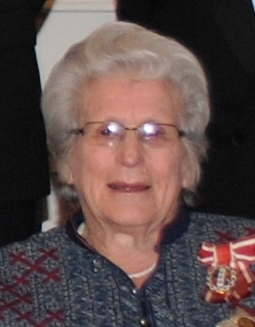
- Dell in 2011
- Born: Miriam Patricia Matthews; 14 June 1924; Hamilton, New Zealand
- Died: 22 March 2022 (aged 97); Carterton, New Zealand
- Known for: Women's rights advocacy
- Spouse: Richard Dell (m. 1946; died 2002)
- Children: 4

Dame Miriam Patricia Dell ONZ DBE JP (née Matthews; 14 June 1924 – 22 March 2022) was a New Zealand women's advocate, botanist and schoolteacher. She was the president of the National Council of Women of New Zealand from 1970 to 1974 and the first New Zealand president of the International Council of Women from 1979 to 1984. She established the Committee on Women, the forerunner to New Zealand's Ministry for Women. Her work promoting women's rights and advancement led to her being appointed a Member of the Order of New Zealand in 1993, New Zealand's highest civilian honour.

== Early life and family ==
Dell was born in 1924 in Hamilton. She was the daughter of Ruby Miriam Crawford and Gerald Matthews. Her family moved to Mount Albert in Auckland in 1931, and she attended Owairaka School, and later Epsom Girls' Grammar School. Dell studied botany at the Auckland University College, and in later years recalled how she had been at first prevented from speaking at the university science club because she was a woman. She subsequently attended the Auckland Teachers' Training College and became a science teacher at Otahuhu College.

In 1946, at age 22, she married Richard Dell and moved with him to Wellington the following year. She continued working as a science teacher after her marriage, which was unusual at the time, and said of her decision, "I was always very keen for women to take their place in the wider world, not just to be at home." Dell and her husband had four daughters, and in the late 1940s and 1950s she raised them while working as a schoolteacher. Her advocacy for women began in 1947 when she joined the Association of Anglican Women, an organisation for young married women.

== Career ==
Dell was a founding member of the Hutt Valley Branch of the National Council of Women of New Zealand. She became the national president of the council in 1970. In 1971, Dell was the only female member of a five-person Committee of Inquiry into Equal Pay set up by the government to investigate equal pay in New Zealand. Her work on this committee directly led to legislative change in New Zealand, such as ensuring equal citizenship rights, matrimonial property sharing and parental leave, and supported the passing of the Equal Pay Act 1972. Dell was also the only woman to sit on the National Development Council from 1969 to 1974. In this role she established a subcommittee to investigate the role of women in national development and to advise the government on women's issues, which became the Committee on Women, the forerunner to New Zealand's Ministry for Women.

In 1974, Dell became chairperson of the Committee on Women and was coordinator for the landmark International Women's Year in 1975, as well as attending all three of the United Nations Conferences for the Decade of Women as a member of the New Zealand Government delegation. She was chairperson of the committee until 1981. One of her achievements was to establish a women's appointment file to encourage government agencies to appoint women to job vacancies as well as men. She also worked with government departments to convene important conferences such as the 1976 Conference on Women Social and Economic Development and 1977 Conference on Women and Health, both held in Wellington.

Dell was elected to the Board of Officers of the International Council of Women (ICW) in 1976, and was elected International President in 1979. She was the first New Zealander to hold this position, and remained in post until 1986. In this role she visited 64 countries and became aware of the difficulties facing women in poorer countries. She was coordinator of the ICW Development Project Program until her retirement. In 1976, she received the Adelaide Ristori Prize from the Italian Cultural Centre for outstanding service. In 1982 she was made a life member of the National Council of Women of New Zealand.

In July 1991, Dell was appointed to chair the Suffrage Trust, set up to promote the centennial of women's suffrage in New Zealand and to allocate NZ$5 million in funding to projects reflecting different aspects of women's lives. Dell died in Carterton on 22 March 2022, at the age of 97.

== Honours and awards ==
In the 1975 New Year Honours, Dell was appointed a Commander of the Order of the British Empire, for public services. In 1977, she was awarded the Queen Elizabeth II Silver Jubilee Medal. In the 1980 New Year Honours, Dell was promoted to the rank of Dame Commander of the Order of the British Empire, for services to women. In 1990, she was awarded the New Zealand 1990 Commemoration Medal. On 6 February 1993, Dell was the 22nd appointee to the Order of New Zealand, New Zealand's highest civil honour. Also in 1993, Dell was awarded the New Zealand Suffrage Centennial Medal.

== Patronage ==
Dell was the patron of the New Zealand Association for Women in the Sciences (AWIS). In 2013, the New Zealand AWIS launched an award for excellence in science mentoring and titled the award in honour of Dell. The biennial Miriam Dell Award is awarded to someone who demonstrates outstanding mentoring efforts to retain females in science, mathematics and technology. Notable winners include Roslyn Kemp (2015), Vivien Kirk (2017), Abby Smith (2019), Di Tracey (2021) and Cate Macinnis-Ng (2023).
