= Ueta Solomona =

Samoan composer, musician, and music educator (1935–2018)

Ueta Mata’utia Pene Solomona OS (15 September 1935 — January 2018) was a Samoan composer, musician, and music educator. He was the first Samoan awarded a Fulbright Scholarship to the United States, and the composer of the first Samoan opera, Jephathah.

Ueta grew up in Apia and was educated at the Marist Brothers primary school. He learned to play the piano before beginning primary school, and began composing hymns and music for brass bands before he was 20. In 1959 he was awarded a Fulbright scholarship to study music at the State University of New York at Fredonia, graduating in 1963 with a BSc in music. On returning to Samoa he was appointed music specialist for all government schools. He subsequently taught music, organised choir festivals, and composed Jephathah, the first Samoan opera, which was performed at the first Festival of Pacific Arts in 1972.

He later worked at the University of the South Pacific as a lecturer in music and expressive arts. After retiring in 2005 he worked for the National University of Samoa and established the National Orchestra of Samoa.

== Recognition ==
Ueta was made an Officer of the Order of Samoa for achievements in music. Following his death his life was celebrated by a concert.
