= 2007 Special Honours (New Zealand) =

New Zealand awards

- Previous: 2007 New Year Honours; Next: 2007 Queen's Birthday Honours
- Type: New Zealand royal honours: Order of New Zealand; Queen's Service Order
- Date: 6 February 2007; 21 May 2007
- Country: New Zealand

Highlights
- Total recipients: 5

The 2007 Special Honours in New Zealand were two Special Honours Lists: the first was published on 6 February 2007, in which four appointments of additional members were made to the Order of New Zealand to celebrate the 20th anniversary of the establishment of the Order; and the second was dated 21 May 2007, and recognised the incumbent governor-general, Anand Satyanand. The appointments were made by Elizabeth II in her right as Queen of New Zealand, on the advice of the New Zealand government.

The recipients of honours are listed here as they were styled before their new honour.

== Order of New Zealand (ONZ) ==
Additional member

- Sir Brian James Lochore KNZM OBE – of Masterton.
- The Right Reverend and the Honourable Sir Paul Alfred Reeves GCMG GCVO QSO – of Auckland.
- Professor Christian Karlson Stead CBE – of Auckland.
- The Right Honourable Sir Arthur Owen Woodhouse KBE DSC – of Auckland.
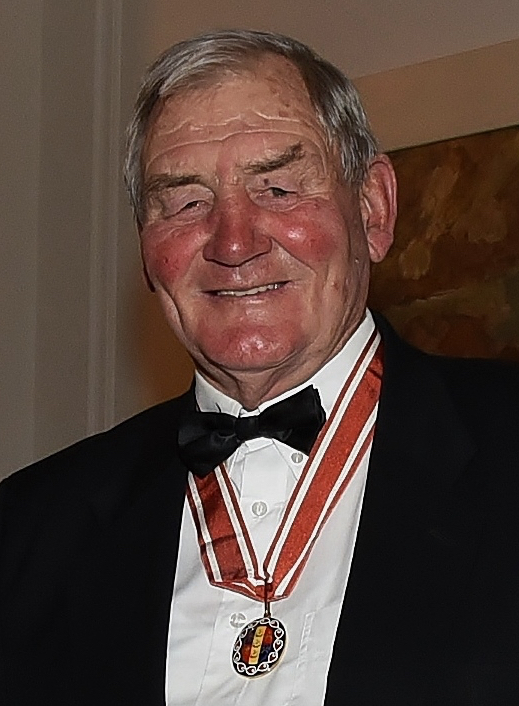
Sir Brian Lochore

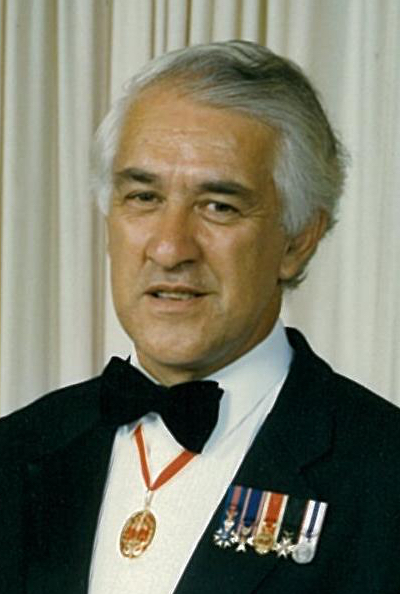
Sir Paul Reeves

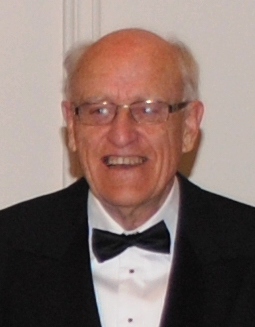
C.K. Stead

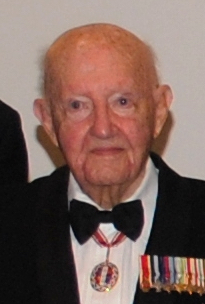
Sir Owen Woodhouse

== Companion of the Queen's Service Order (QSO) ==
Additional

- The Honourable Anand Satyanand PCNZM – Principal Companion of the Queen's Service Order and Governor-General and Commander-in-Chief in and over the Realm of New Zealand.
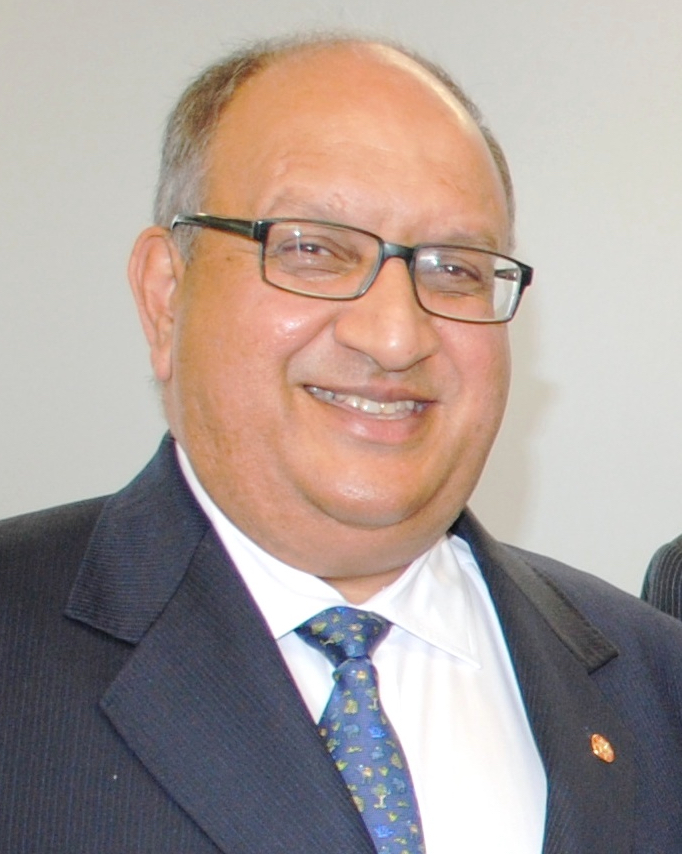
Anand Satyanand
