= Tauili'ili Uili Meredith =

Samoan diplomat (died 2007)

Tauili'ili Uili Meredith (died 4 December 2007) was a Samoan Educator, Civil Servant and Diplomat. He served as Samoan Ambassador to Belgium and the European Union from May 1997 until September 2005.

Tauili'ili was a civil servant, who served as Director of Agriculture, Forestry, Fisheries and Meteorology. He also served as Head of the University of the South Pacific's Alafua Campus and from 1985 - 1992 was the first Vice Chancellor of the National University of Samoa. In 1996 he was appointed Director of the 7th Festival of Pacific Arts.

After retiring as an ambassador he moved to Melbourne, Australia, and died there in 2007.
