= Dianne Tracey =

New Zealand marine biologist

- Born: Dianne Margaret Tracey
- Education: Wellington Polytechnic
- Scientific career
- Fields: fisheries, deep-sea corals
- Workplaces: Ministry for Agriculture and Fisheries, NIWA

Dianne Margaret Tracey is a New Zealand marine biologist specializing in research on deep-sea fisheries and deep-sea corals at the National Institute of Water and Atmospheric Research (NIWA). She works on the biology of deep water fishes such as orange roughy, and deep sea corals. She was one of the first women in New Zealand to work in fisheries and to work on research vessels and has spent her career advocating and mentoring women in marine science.

== Education and career ==
Tracey went to Sacred Heart Girls' College, New Plymouth. She then attended Wellington Polytechnic and studied for a New Zealand Certificate in Science in biology. She was determined to study marine biology, and not to become a nurse or a teacher, the main options for girls at the time. She started her career in 1972 as a technician at the Ministry for Agriculture and Fisheries. She travelled overseas between 1976 and 1980, working in a fish factory and at the Hafrannsóknarstofnunin Marine research station in Iceland. On return to New Zealand she moved into working on deep-sea fisheries research at the Ministry for Agriculture and Fisheries. She worked primarily on stock assessments for deep sea fish orange roughy. She led the programme and voyage leadership in the newly declared Exclusive Economic Zone. In 1990 Tracey moved from a technical role to a science role and after the formation of the NIWA. She moved into deep-sea invertebrate ecology, working primarily on deep-sea corals, from 2006.

== Research ==
Tracey has worked on the biology of deep water fishes such as orange roughy and has spent a considerable time at sea on research ships undertaking trawl surveys to provide data for New Zealand fisheries stock assessments. Her work has involved using otoliths to determine the age of fishes. In the last 10 years her focus has shifted from deep-sea fish to deep-sea corals and deep-sea benthic marine ecosystems - also known as vulnerable marine ecosystems (VME). She has worked on understanding the distribution, age and growth rates of deep-sea corals, and contributing to benthic habitat suitability modelling studies. She has also developed several deep-sea invertebrate and deep-sea coral guides in collaboration with Fisheries New Zealand, for by-catch observers on commercial fishing boats. Tracey is a recognised international expert on deep-sea corals and co-organised the 4th International Deep Sea Coral Symposium in Wellington in 2008. In 2019, she published a review titled State of Knowledge of deep-sea corals in the New Zealand region. She also participates in working groups for the New Zealand Department of Conservation and Fisheries New Zealand to help protect deep-sea corals.

== Linking science and arts ==
Tracey has always been an advocate for linking arts and culture to science technology engineering and mathematics (STEM). In 2008–2010 she co-curated an exhibition of deep-sea corals] at Te Papa and in 2016 she featured in the documentary On an unknown beach directed by Adam Luxton and Summer Agnew, which explores landscapes of ruin, including the impact of deep ocean trawling on deep sea coral ecosystems on the Chatham Rise, New Zealand.

She was awarded a New Zealand Suffrage Centennial Medal 1993.

== Women in science ==
Tracey received the 2021 Miriam Dell Award from the Association for Women in the Sciences (AWIS) for her advocacy for and mentoring of women working in science. Tracey began her career working for the New Zealand, Ministry of Agriculture and Fisheries (MAF) in the 1980s and she spent a lot of time at sea on research and commercial fishing vessels, often the only woman on board. She persevered in this male-dominated field and served as voyage leader and co-leader on a number of expeditions. She was a pioneer for women working in fisheries, and has worked to improve the attitudes to women on research vessels and to create a culturally safe environment on research ships, paving the way for the next generation of sea-going researchers and leaders. Tracey was also instrumental in helping to set up the (since closed) Greta Point Child Care Centre in the early 1990s for parents working at NIWA.

== Selected publications ==
- Clark, Malcolm R., Owen F. Anderson, RIC Chris Francis, and Dianne M. Tracey. "The effects of commercial exploitation on orange roughy (Hoplostethus atlanticus) from the continental slope of the Chatham Rise, New Zealand, from 1979 to 1997." Fisheries Research 45, no. 3 (2000): 217-238.
- Andrews, Allen H., Dianne M. Tracey, and Matthew R. Dunn. "Lead–radium dating of orange roughy (Hoplostethus atlanticus): validation of a centenarian life span." Canadian Journal of Fisheries and Aquatic Sciences 66, no. 7 (2009): 1130-1140.
- Tracey, Dianne M., Helen Neil, Peter Marriott, Allen H. Andrews, Gregor M. Cailliet, and Juan A. Sanchez. "Age and growth of two genera of deep-sea bamboo corals (Family Isididae) in New Zealand waters." Bulletin of Marine Science 81, no. 3 (2007): 393-408.
- Lin, Mei-Fang, Marcelo Visentini Kitahara, Haiwei Luo, Dianne Tracey, Jonathan Geller, Hironobu Fukami, David John Miller, and Chaolun Allen Chen. "Mitochondrial genome rearrangements in the Scleractinia/Corallimorpharia complex: implications for coral phylogeny." Genome Biology and Evolution 6, no. 5 (2014): 1086-1095.
