= 1987 Special Honours (New Zealand) =

Awards list for New Zealand

The 1987 Special Honours in New Zealand was a Special Honours Lists, dated 6 February 1987, making the five foundation appointments to the Order of New Zealand.

== Order of New Zealand (ONZ) ==
Ordinary member

- Te Arikinui Dame Te Atairangikaahu DBE.
- Dr Clarence Edward Beeby CMG.
- Sonja Margaret Loveday Davies JP.
- Sir Edmund Percival Hillary KBE.
- The Honourable Sir Arnold Henry Nordmeyer KCMG JP.
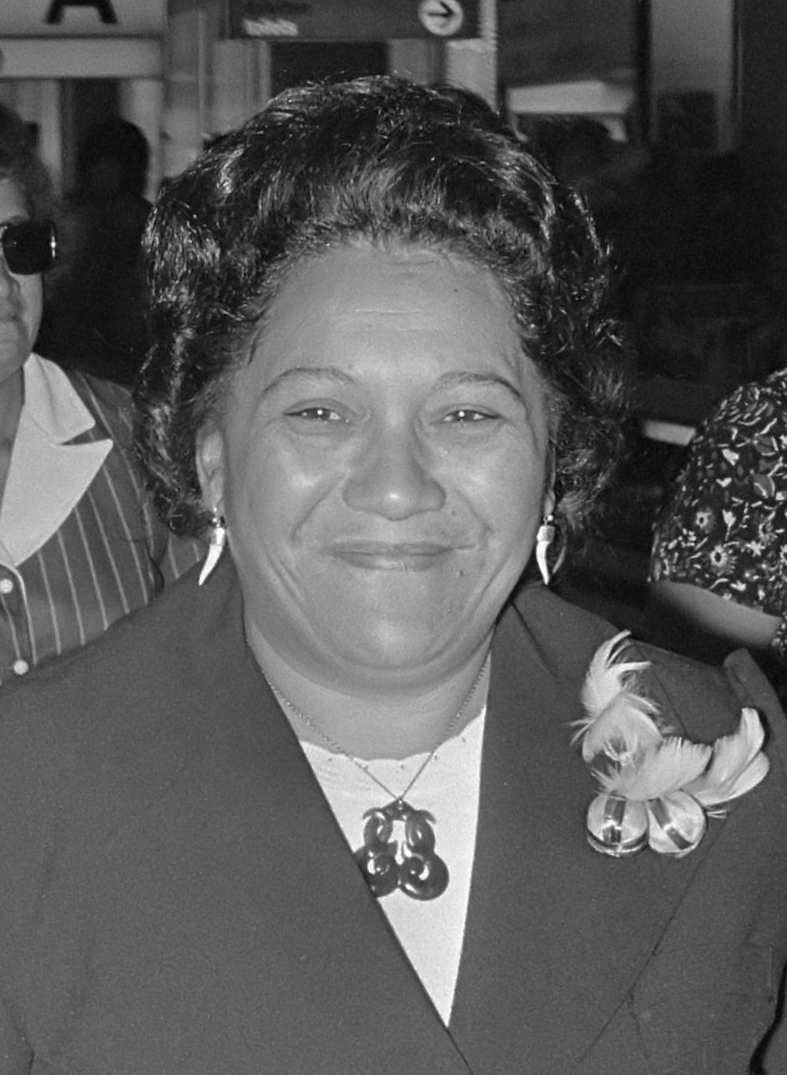
Dame Te Atairangikaahu

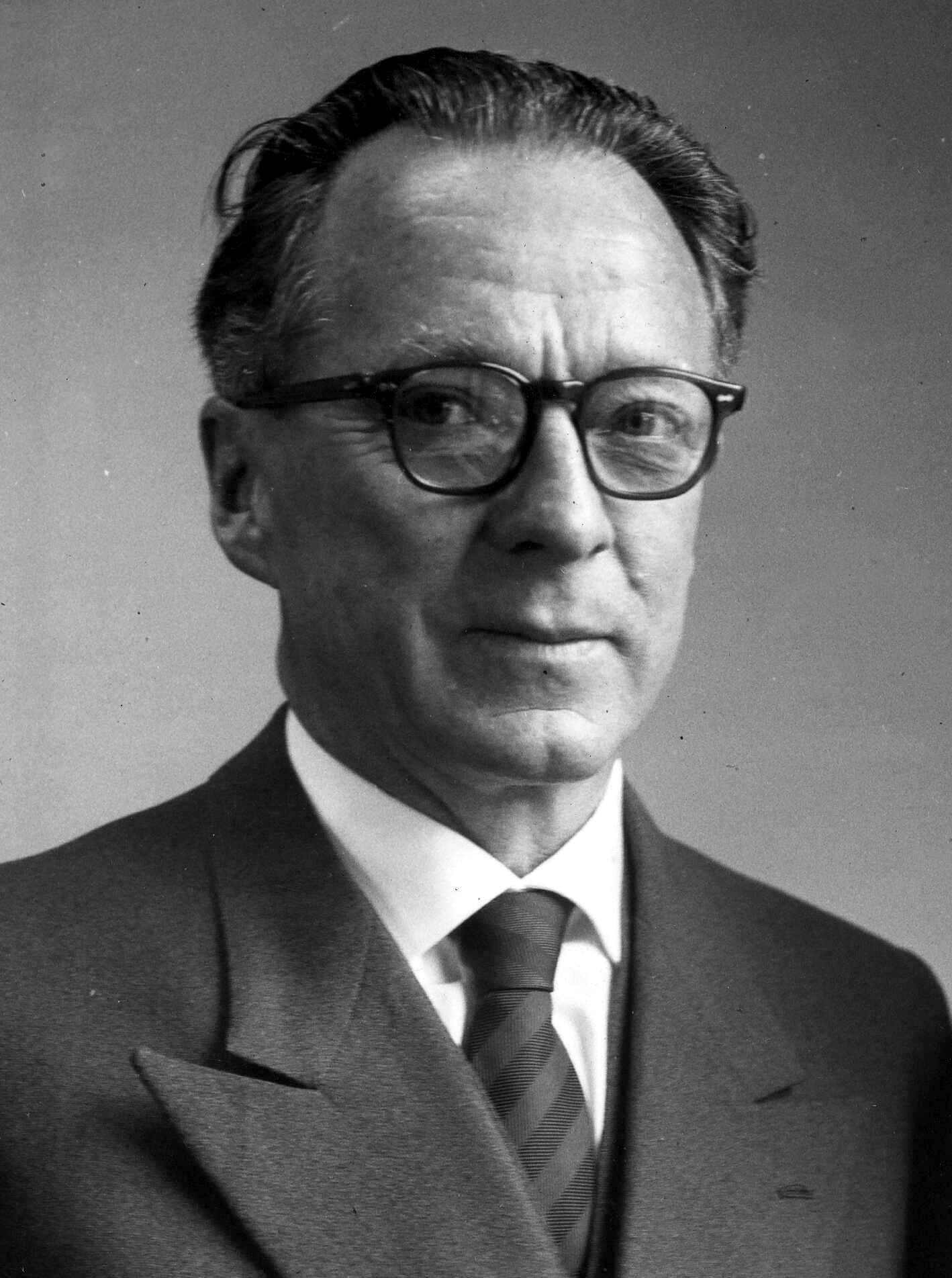
C. E. Beeby

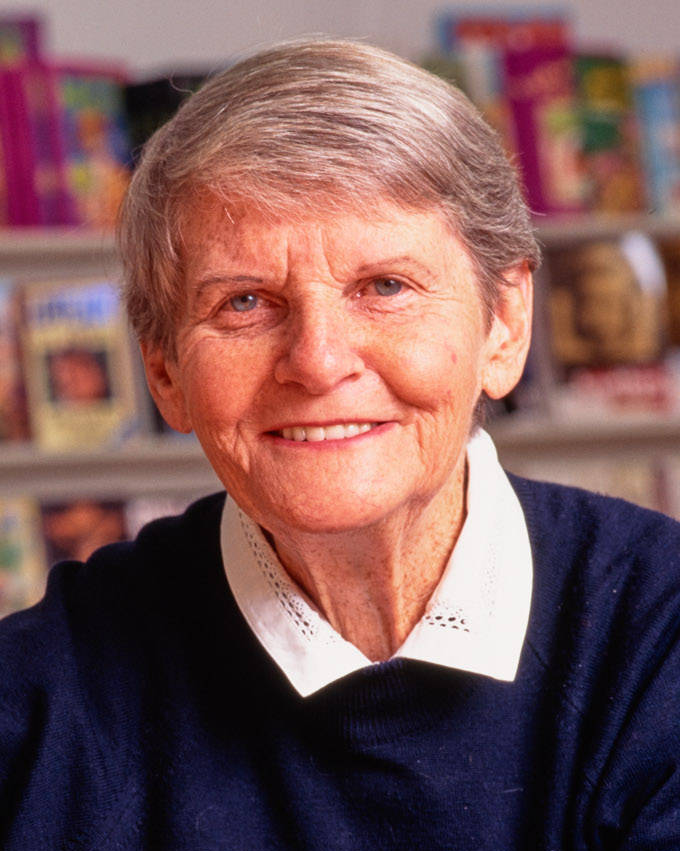
Sonja Davies

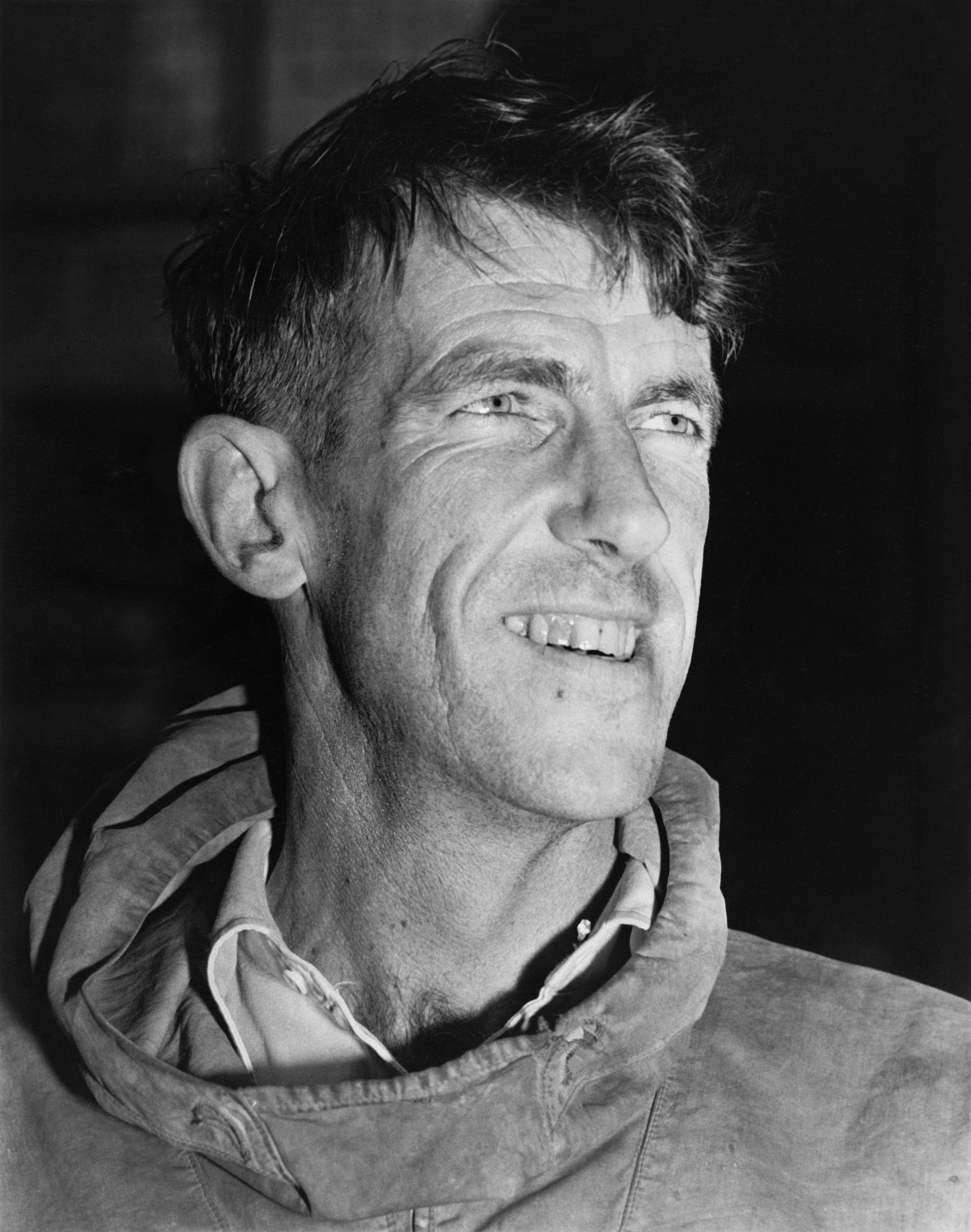
Sir Edmund Hillary

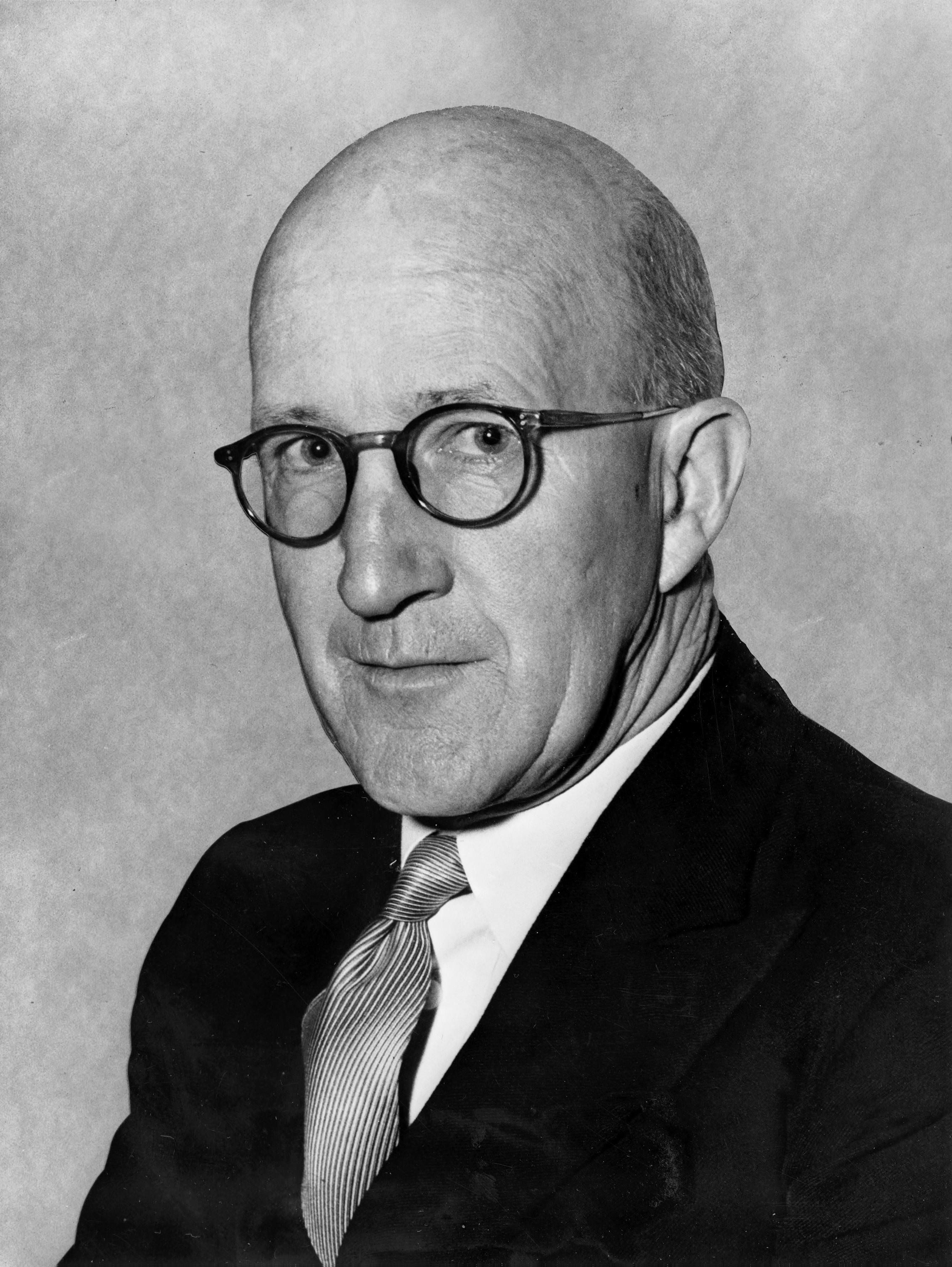
Sir Arnold Nordmeyer
