= 1993 Special Honours (New Zealand) =

Awards list for New Zealand

The 1993 Special Honours in New Zealand was a Special Honours Lists, dated 6 February 1993 and marking Waitangi Day and the centennial of women's suffrage in New Zealand, in which three women were appointed to the Order of New Zealand.

== Order of New Zealand (ONZ) ==
Ordinary member

- Dame Miriam Patricia Dell DBE JP – of Ōtaki.
- Margaret Mahy – of Governors Bay.
- The Honourable Tini Whetu Marama Tirikatene-Sullivan MP – Member of Parliament for Southern Maori since 1967.
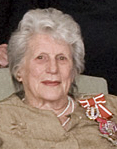
Dame Miriam Dell

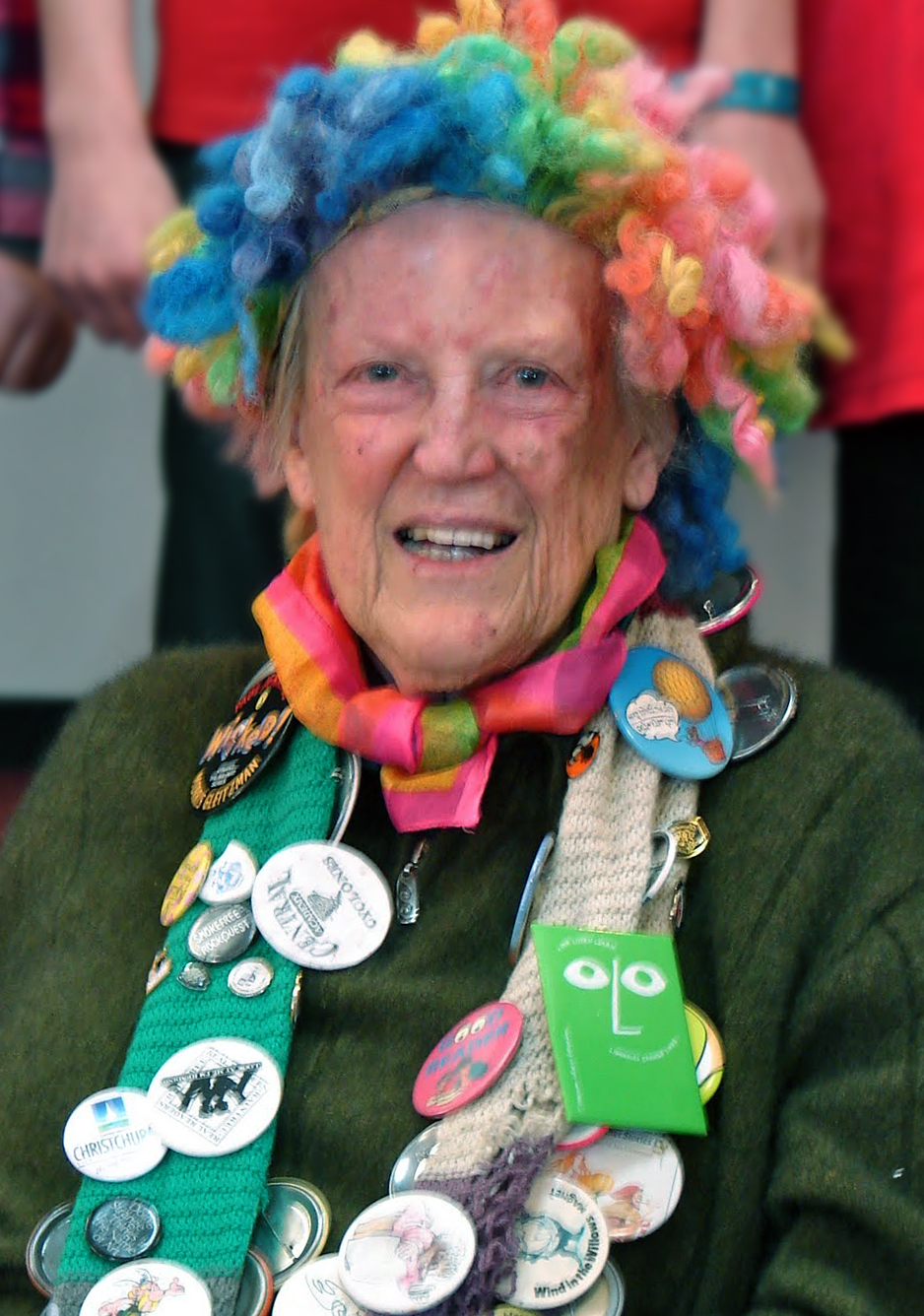
Margaret Mahy

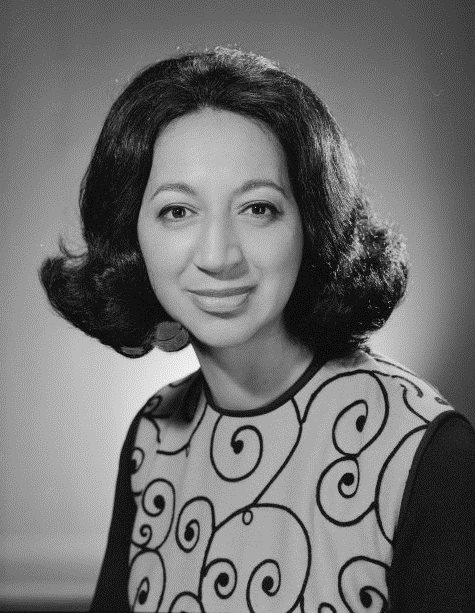
Whetu Tirikatene-Sullivan
