= National University of Samoa =

University in Samoa

Coordinates: 13.8510°S 171.7503°W

- Lē Iunivesitē Aoao o Sāmoa
- Motto: Samoan: Ia Ao Samoa "Let there be light on Samoa"
- Type: Public
- Established: 1984
- President: Tuifuisaʻa Patila Amosa
- Academic staff: 184 (2022)
- Administrative staff: 240 (2020)
- Students: 3,223 (2022)
- Postgraduates: 78 (2020)
- Location: Apia, Samoa
- Colors: Silver, Dark Royal Blue and Light Blue
- Website: www.nus.edu.ws

The National University of Samoa (Samoan: Lē Iunivesitē Aoao o Sāmoa) is the only national university in Samoa. Established in 1984 by an act of parliament, it is coeducational and provides certificate, diploma, and undergraduate degree programs, as well as technical and vocational training. About 2,000 students were enrolled in 2010 with an estimated 300 staff. It offers a wide range of programmes including Arts, Business and Entrepreneurship, Education, Science, Nursing, Engineering and Maritime Training. The Centre for Samoan Studies, established in the university for the teaching of the Samoan language and culture, offers undergraduate and graduate degrees as well as the world's first degree in Master of Samoan Studies.

The National University of Samoa has the distinction of being one of two universities in Samoa. The second is the University of the South Pacific - Alafua Campus which specializes in Agriculture. The campus was built in part with funding from the Government of Japan. It is built around the largest Fale Samoa in the world.

== History ==
The National University of Samoa was established in 1984 by an Act of parliament. Its first degree, the Bachelor of Education, was launched in 1987. A year later, the Bachelor of Arts degree was introduced. The first graduates in both programs were awarded their degrees in 1990.

Soon after, the Faculty of Commerce and the Faculty of Science were established. The Samoan Health Department's School of Nursing was merged into the university in 1993 as the Faculty of Nursing, and the Western Samoa Teachers' College was merged during 1997 as the Faculty of Education.

The Institute of Samoan Studies was established in 1999; its name was changed in 2005 to the Centre for Samoan Studies. In 2006, Samoa Polytechnic merged into the university as the Institute of Technology.

In 2006 the university was merged with Samoa Polytechnic and its governing legislation was updated as the National University of Samoa Act 2006.

== Governance ==
The university is governed by a council, chaired by the pro-chancellor. The council consists of the Pro-Chancellor, Vice-Chancellor, the Vice-Chancellor of the University of the South Pacific, a member of the university Senate, staff and student representatives, up to six members appointed by the O le Ao o le Malo, and up to four additional members co-opted by the council. Council members hold office for between one and three years, and may be reappointed for a maximum of three terms. The titular head of the council is the chancellor, who is appointed by the O le Ao o le Malo for a five-year term. The university's chief executive is the vice-chancellor, who is appointed by the council.

In 2019 the vice-chancellor, Professor Fui Asofou So'o, was suspended by Cabinet pending an internal investigation. He resigned in June 2019, and was replaced by Aiono Alec Ekeroma.

The following people have held the role of vice-chancellor:

- Tauili'ili Uili Meredith (1985—1992)
- Tauilalo Lanuimoana Palepoi (1992—1998)
- Magele Mauiliu Magele (1998—2009)
- Fui Asofou So'o (2009—2019)
- Aiono Alec Ekeroma (2019—2023)
- Tuifuisaʻa Patila Amosa (2023-)

== Faculties and courses ==
NUS's academic offerings include programs from eight faculties and schools:

- Faculty of Arts
- Faculty of Business and Entrepreneurship
- Faculty of Education
- Faculty of Nursing and Health Science
- Faculty of Science
- School of Business & General Studies
- School of Engineering
- School of Maritime Training

== Notable academics and staff ==
- Aiono Fanaafi Le Tagaloa - Professor of Samoan Studies
- Malama Meleisea - historian
- Gatoloai Tili Afamasaga - educator
- Maulolo Tavita Amosa - orator
- Safua Akeli Amaama - Samoan Studies academic
- Tuifuisa’a Patila Amosa - oceanographer
- Ueta Solomona

== South Pacific Games ==
The university's gymnasium was used as a venue for the 2007 South Pacific Games and the accommodation areas were made available to the New Caledonia team.

== Sources ==
- Eric Clem Groves (2019). The Five Tala University: Higher Education in Developing Countries: A Case Study of the National University of Samoa (PDF) (MDS). National University of Samoa.
