= 1994 Special Honours (New Zealand) =

Awards list for New Zealand

The 1994 Special Honours in New Zealand was a Special Honours Lists, dated 6 February 1994, making one appointment to the Order of New Zealand.

== Order of New Zealand (ONZ) ==
Ordinary member

- The Right Honourable Sir Thaddeus Pearcey McCarthy KBE.
