= Tuifuisaʻa Patila Amosa =

Samoan oceanographer

Patila Amosa

Academic background
- Education: University of Otago
- Thesis: The Dissolution Kinetics of Calcium Carbonate in Seawater: Development and Application of an Automated pH-stat Method for the Measurement of Dissolution Rates (2015)
- Doctoral advisor: Abigail Smith; Kim Currie; Keith Hunter

Tuifuisaʻa Patila Malua Amosa is a Samoan oceanographer. She is Dean of Sciences at the National University of Samoa.

Amosa was educated at Flinders University in Australia and the University of Otago in New Zealand, graduating with an MSc in Environmental Science in 2007 and a PhD in Chemistry in 2015. Her PhD was on ocean acidification.

She has taught at the National University of Samoa for over 25 years. In July 2021 she was promoted to senior lecturer in recognition of her regional research leadership in climate change. She became President and Vice Chancellor of the National University of Samoa in 2023, and also that year, 2023, she was promoted to be Professor of Environmental Science.

In March 2026 she was reappointed as vice-chancellor for a further three year term.
