= Sacred Heart Girls' College, New Plymouth =

Sacred Heart Girls' College

Location
- 9 Pukaka Street, Fitzroy, New Plymouth, New Zealand; 39.0527°S 174.1027°E

Information
- Type: Integrated secondary (year 7–13) single sex, girls
- Motto: Latin: Age Quod Agis (Whatever you do, do to the best of your ability)
- Established: 1884; 142 years ago
- Ministry of Education Institution no.: 174
- Principal: Barbara Costelloe
- Enrolment: 737 (July 2026)
- Socio-economic decile: 8
- Website: shgcnp.school.nz

Sacred Heart Girls' College is a single-sex (girls) secondary and intermediate school in New Plymouth, New Zealand.

Sacred Heart started as a school and boarding facility called Sacred Heart College, founded by the Sisters of Our Lady of the Missions in 1884. The school was next to the present St Joseph's Church and catered for primary & secondary students. In 1960 the school moved to its present site and was renamed Sacred Heart Girls’ College New Plymouth. The boarding hostel for up to 78 boarders, now called "Elizabeth House", was added in 1970. The original school hall was demolished and rebuilt into new rooms for Māori, drama, music and general classrooms, opened in January 2012.

The college, which is under the control of the Mission College New Plymouth Trust Board, became an integrated secondary school, with an attached intermediate school in 1982. Buildings erected since then include the library, staff room and administrative facilities known as the Centennial Wing, a Mathematics block (rebuilt in 2023), Religious Studies block, Graphics workshops and a new 5-classroom block (including textiles technology). A new Food-Technology and Textiles block was built in December 2025. The college is situated in grounds which include tennis courts, netball courts and two sports fields.

The current principal is Barbara Costelloe.

== Enrolment ==
As a state-integrated school, the proprietors of Sacred Heart Girls' College charge compulsory attendance dues to cover capital costs. For the 2025 school year, the attendance dues payable are $544 per year for students in years 7 and 8, and $1,088 per year for students in year 9 and above.

As of July 2026, Sacred Heart Girls' College has a roll of 737 students, of which 114 (15.5%) identify as Māori.

As of 2026, the school has an Equity Index of 414, placing it amongst schools whose students have few socioeconomic barriers to achievement (roughly equivalent to deciles 8 and 9 under the former socio-economic decile system).

== Houses ==
- Barbier (Blue)
- Vianney (Red)
- Lourdes (Green)
- Chanel (Yellow)

== Notable alumni ==
- Cassandra Crowley - lawyer, accountant, administrator
- Carinnya Feaunati, architect
- Hope Ralph - New Zealand field hockey player
- Deborah Russell - Member of the New Zealand Parliament and cabinet minister
- Dianne Tracey - marine biologist

== Sources ==
- Ernest Richard Simmons, Brief history of the Catholic Church in New Zealand, Catholic Publications Centre, Auckland, 1978.
- For the glory of God in New Plymouth : centenary : Sisters of Our Lady of the Missions, New Plymouth-Taranaki-New Zealand, Sisters of Our Lady of the Missions and Centennial Committee, 1985, New Plymouth, 1985.
- Michael King, God's farthest outpost : a history of Catholics in New Zealand, Viking, Auckland 1997.
- Michael O'Meeghan S.M., Steadfast in hope : the story of the Catholic Archdiocese of Wellington 1850–2000, Dunmore press, Palmerston North, 2003.
