= 1989 Special Honours (New Zealand) =

Awards list for New Zealand

The 1989 Special Honours in New Zealand was a Special Honours List, dated 6 February 1989, in which two appointments were made to the Order of New Zealand and one judge received a knighthood.

== Order of New Zealand (ONZ) ==
Ordinary member

- The Right Reverend Manuhuia Augustus Bennett CMG.
- Henry George Lang CB.

== Order of the British Empire ==
=== Knight Grand Cross (GBE) ===
Civil division

- The Honourable Mr Justice Thomas Eichelbaum – Chief Justice of New Zealand.
