= 1990 Special Honours (New Zealand) =

Awards list for New Zealand

The 1990 Special Honours in New Zealand were three special honours lists: the first was dated 6 February 1990 and made appointments to the Order of New Zealand and the Queen's Service Order; the second was dated 17 May 1990 made awards of the Polar Medal; and the third was dated 27 November 1990, to recognise the incoming governor-general, Dame Catherine Tizard.

== Order of New Zealand (ONZ) ==
Additional member

- Her Majesty Queen Elizabeth The Queen Mother.
- Dr Thomas Allen Monro Curnow CBE.
- The Honourable Michael John Duffy MP.
- Nene Janet Paterson Clutha (Janet Frame) CBE.
- Arthur Leslie Lydiard OBE.
- Sir Guy Richardson Powles KBE CMG ED.

Honorary member

- Sir Shridath Surendranath Ramphal (Sonny Ramphal) OE AC CMG QC.
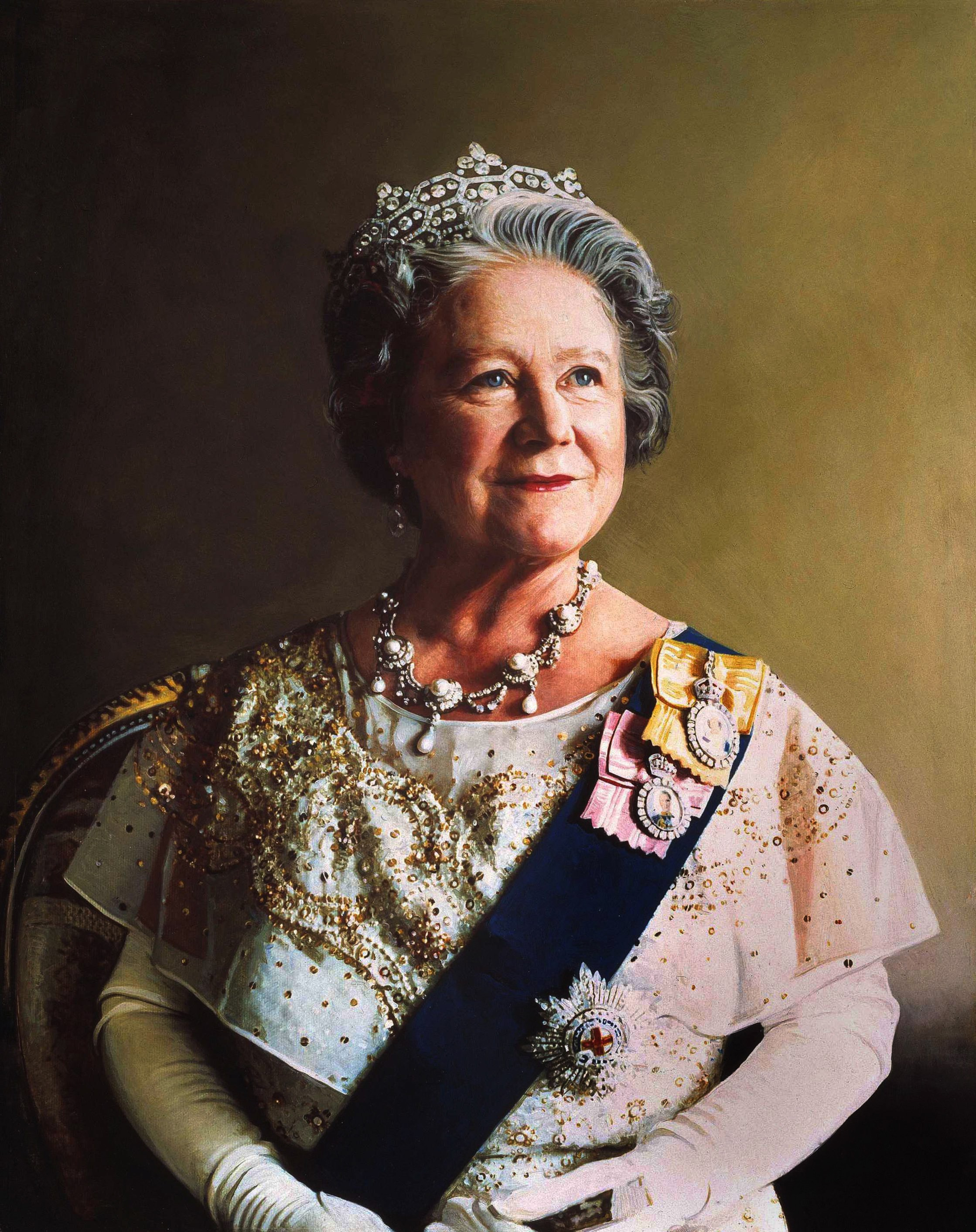
Queen Elizabeth The Queen Mother

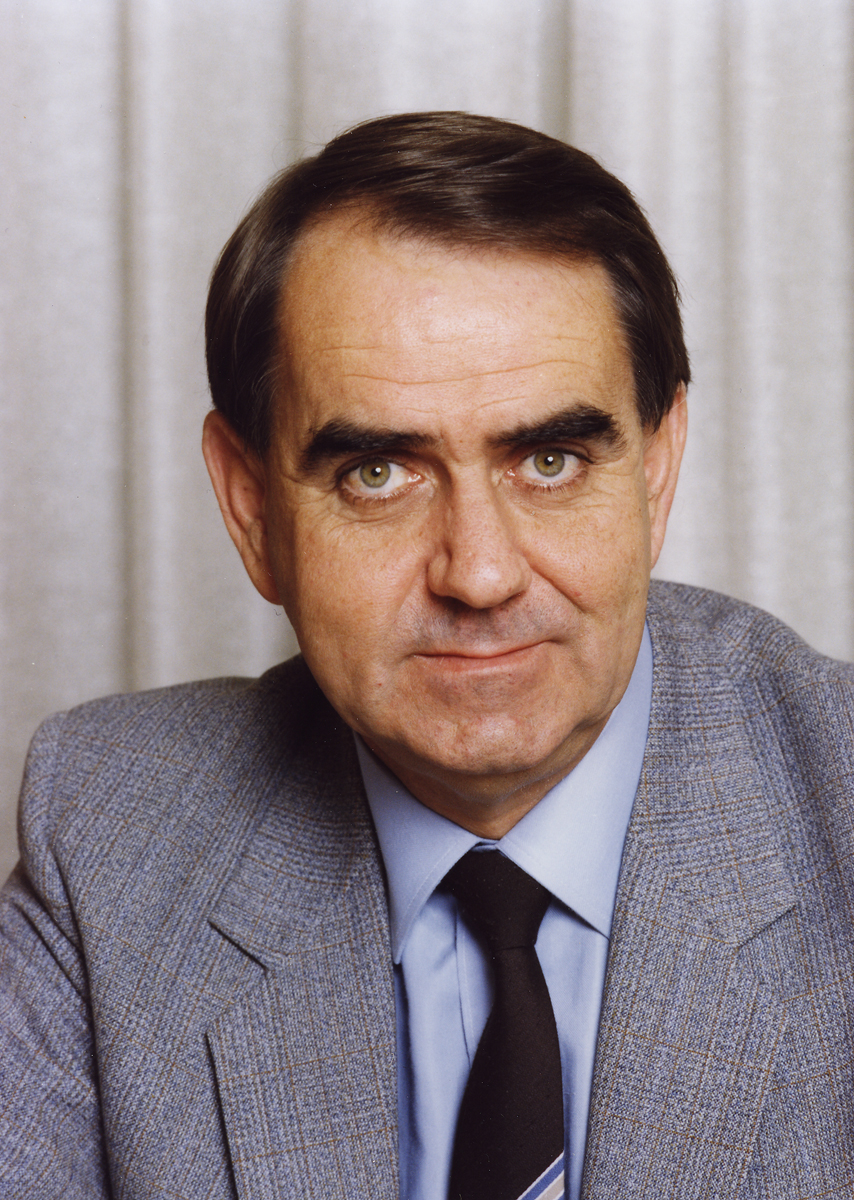
Michael Duffy

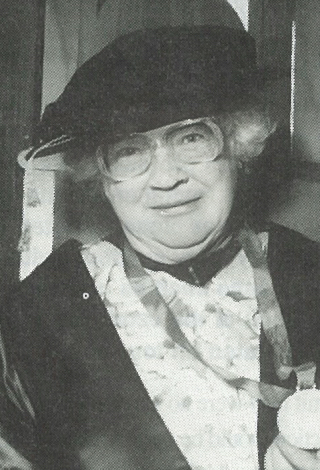
Janet Frame

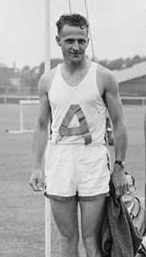
Arthur Lydiard

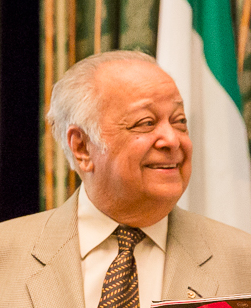
Sir Sonny Ramphal

== Order of St Michael and St George ==
=== Dame Grand Cross (GCMG) ===
- Dame Catherine Anne Tizard DBE – Governor-General Designate of New Zealand.
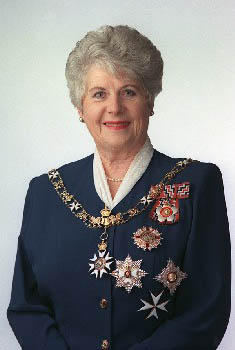
Dame Catherine Tizard

== Companion of the Queen's Service Order (QSO) ==
=== For community service ===
Extra companion

- Her Royal Highness The Princess Royal GCVO.

Additional companion

- Beverley Gwendolen, Lady Reeves.
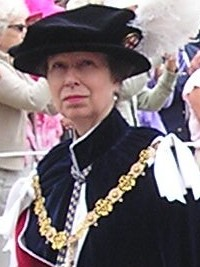
Anne, Princess Royal

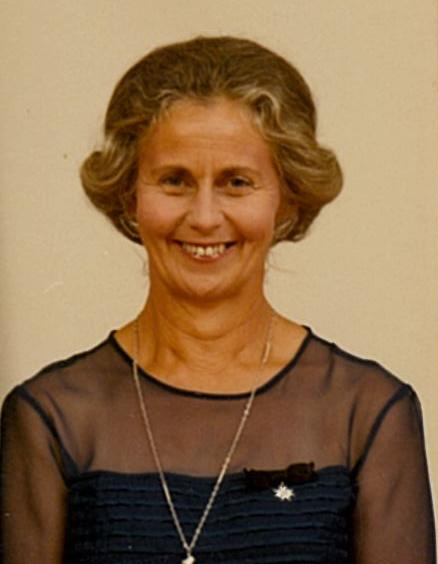
Beverley, Lady Reeves

=== For public services ===
Additional companion

- The Most Reverend Sir Paul Alfred Reeves GCMG GCVO – Principal Companion of the Queen's Service Order and Governor-General and Commander-in-Chief in and over New Zealand since 1985.

Ordinary companion

- The Right Honourable Sir William (Frederick Payne) Heseltine GCVO AC KCB – private secretary to The Queen since 1986.
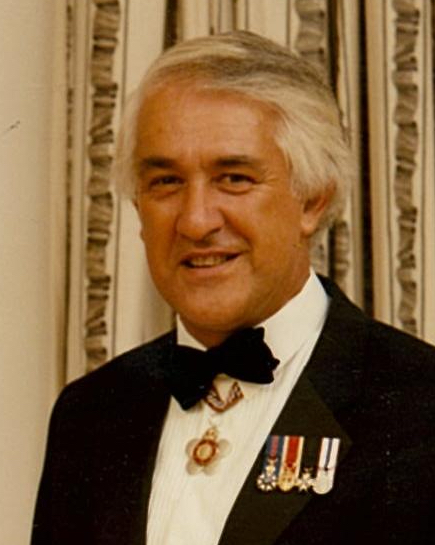
Sir Paul Reeves

== Polar Medal ==
With clasp "Antarctic 1978–88"

- Alexander Richard Pyne – of Wellington. For good services as a member of New Zealand expeditions to Antarctica in recent years.
- Garth Edwin Varcoe – of Christchurch. For good services as a member of New Zealand expeditions to Antarctica in recent years.
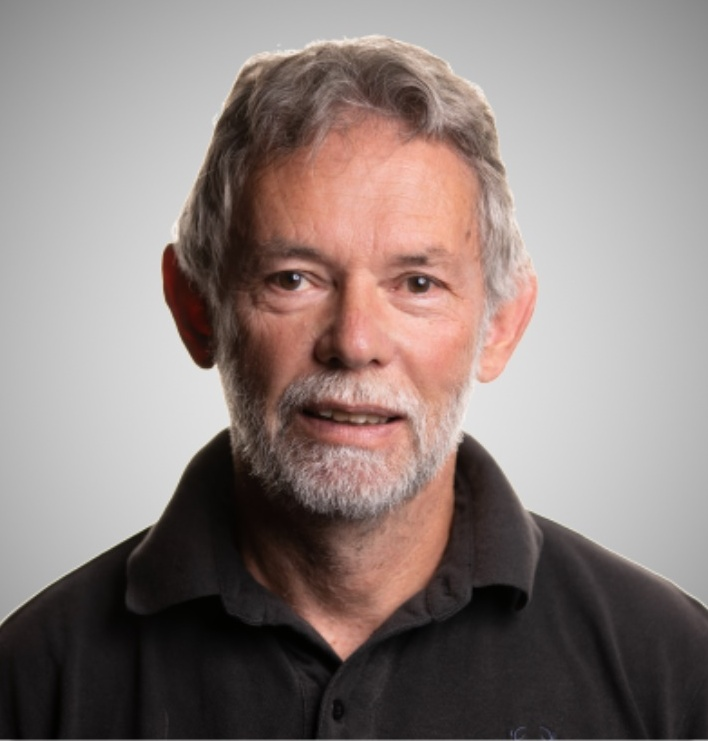
Alex Pyne
