= Carinnya Feaunati =

New Zealand-born Samoan architect

- Born: Porirua, New Zealand

Academic background
- Education: Victoria University of Wellington, Sacred Heart Girls' College, New Plymouth, Victoria University of Wellington
- Thesis: E Toe Sasa'a Le Fafao; Return to Paradise (2014)
- Academic advisor: Daniele Abreu e Lima

Carinnya Feaunati is a Samoan New Zealand architect, cultural design advisor and lecturer.

== Early life and education ==
Feaunati was born in Porirua. Her parents are both Samoan, and came to New Zealand in the 1970s and 80s. Feaunati holds the chief title of T’iafelelea’i from her father's village ⠀⠀, Fasito’outa⠀⠀ and Papali'i from her maternal grandmother's ties to Sapapali'i. In 1996, the family moved from Porirua to New Plymouth, for her father's work, where there were very few Pacific families. Feaunati attended Sacred Heart Girls’ College, where she was head prefect. She describes how the school Polynesian dance club practices were held in her living room as it was only her and her sisters participating. Feaunati grew up in state housing. She became interested in becoming an architect when she noticed the difference in quality of built environment amongst her friends' houses.

Feaunati received a Keystone Trust study award in 2010, to enable her to study a Bachelor of Architecture at Victoria University of Wellington. She followed this with a Master of Architecture degree; her thesis was titled E Toe Sasa'a Le Fafao; Return to Paradise and concerned a proposal for a tattoo and carpentry school at a tsunami-damaged site in Samoa. She was a finalist in the 2014 Student Design Awards, and her master's project led on to other work with Atelier Workshop: Bonnifait + Giesen and NIWA on building for resilience in the village of Sa'anapu, Samoa.

== Career ==
Feaunati tutors and guest lectures at the School of Architecture at Victoria University of Wellington, and is both a registered architect and cultural design lead at Designgroup Stapleton Elliott. She is interested in how to build low-cost housing at scale, how design can be more culturally responsive, and how architecture can respond to global change and disaster recovery. In 2020 Feaunati co-founded MAU Studio with friends.

Feaunati was on the jury of the Architecture + Women NZ Dulux Awards in 2023. She was appointed to the board of the New Zealand Institute of Architects in 2022.

Feaunati has twice been a New Zealand delegate to the Young Pacific Leaders Forum, in Hawaii in 2017 and in Suva, Fiji in 2018.
