= Order of New Zealand =

Order of chivalry in New Zealand

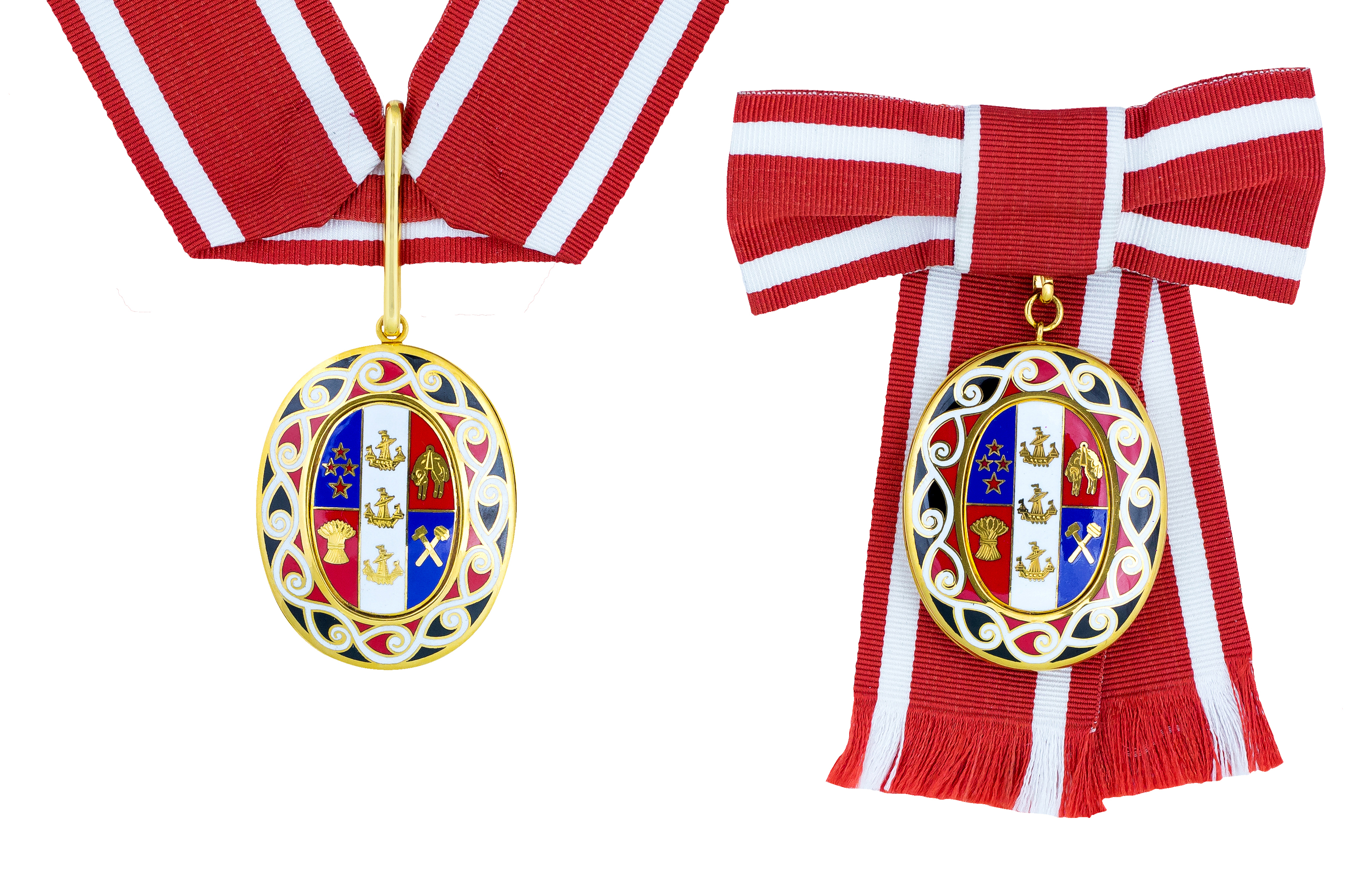
- Badge of a Member of the Order of New Zealand (neck ribbon and bow)

Awarded by the Monarch of New Zealand
- Type: Order
- Founded: 6 February 1987
- Eligibility: Subjects of the Crown
- Awarded for: Outstanding service to the Crown and people of New Zealand in a civil or military capacity
- Status: Currently constituted
- Founder: Elizabeth II
- Sovereign: Charles III
- Grades: Member (ONZ)

Statistics
- First induction: 6 February 1987
- Last induction: 5 June 2023
- Total inductees: 46 ordinary members 21 additional members 2 honorary members

Precedence
- Next (higher): Order of Merit
- Next (lower): New Zealand Order of Merit
- Ribbon of the Order of New Zealand

The Order of New Zealand is the highest honour in the New Zealand royal honours system, created "to recognise outstanding service to the Crown and people of New Zealand in a civil or military capacity". It was instituted by royal warrant on 6 February 1987. The order is modelled on the Order of Merit and the Order of the Companions of Honour.

== Composition ==
The order comprises the Sovereign and ordinary, additional and honorary members. The ordinary membership is limited to 20 living members, and at any time there may be fewer than 20. Additional members may be appointed to commemorate important royal, state or national occasions, and such appointments were made in 1990 for the 150th anniversary of the Treaty of Waitangi, in 2002 for the Queen's Golden Jubilee, in 2007 for the 20th anniversary of the institution of the Order, in 2012 for the Queen's Diamond Jubilee, in 2022 for the Queen's Platinum Jubilee, and in 2023 to mark the coronation of King Charles III. Additional members have the same status as ordinary members. Honorary membership is for citizens of nations of which the Sovereign is not head of state. Members are entitled to the post-nominal letters "ONZ".

Appointments to the order are made by royal warrant under the monarch's sign manual on the prime minister's advice. The order is administered by a Secretary and Registrar (the Clerk of the Executive Council).

Richie McCaw represented the Order at the coronation of Charles III and Camilla in 2023, and took part in the procession of the King and Queen at the beginning of the ceremony.

== Insignia ==
The insignia is made up of an oval medallion of the coat of arms of New Zealand in gold and coloured enamel, worn on a white and ochre ribbon around the neck for men or a bow for women on their left shoulder.

== Current members ==
- Sovereign: The King of New Zealand

	Name	Portrait	Date of appointment	Age	Known for
Ordinary members
1	Dame Kiri Te Kanawa; ONZ CH DBE AC		17 June 1995	82	Opera singer
2	Sir Don McKinnon; ONZ GCVO PC		31 December 2007	87	Former Commonwealth Secretary-General
3	Helen Clark; ONZ SSI PC		31 December 2009	76	Former Prime Minister of New Zealand
4	Sir Bob Charles; ONZ KNZM CBE		31 December 2010	90	Golfer
5	Albert Wendt; ONZ CNZM		3 June 2013	87	Writer
6	Sir Ron Carter; ONZ KNZM		2 June 2014	91	Businessman
7	Sir Peter Gluckman; ONZ KNZM		1 June 2015	77	Scientist
8	Richie McCaw; ONZ		31 December 2015	45	Rugby union player
9	Joy Cowley; ONZ DCNZM OBE		30 December 2017	90	Writer
10	Sir Mason Durie; ONZ KNZM		31 December 2020	87	Psychiatrist
11	Dame Anne Salmond; ONZ DBE		31 December 2020	80	Historian
12	Vacant				
13	Vacant				
14	Vacant				
15	Vacant				
16	Vacant				
17	Vacant				
18	Vacant				
19	Vacant				
20	Vacant				
Additional members
1	Michael Duffy; ONZ		6 February 1990	88	Former Attorney-General of Australia
2	C. K. Stead; ONZ CBE		6 February 2007	94	Writer
3	Dame Margaret Bazley; ONZ DNZM		4 June 2012	88	Public servant
4	Sir Peter Jackson; ONZ KNZM		4 June 2012	65	Film director
5	Dame Malvina Major; ONZ GNZM DBE		4 June 2012	83	Opera singer
6	Dame Silvia Cartwright; ONZ PCNZM DBE QSO DStJ		6 June 2022	82	Jurist and former governor-general
7	Sir Tipene O'Regan; ONZ		6 June 2022	87	Māori leader
8	Queen Camilla; LG LT ONZ GCVO GBE CD PC		5 June 2023	79	Consort of Charles III, King of New Zealand

- Officers:
  - Secretary and Registrar: Rachel Hayward

== Deceased members ==
	Name	Portrait	Date of appointment	Date of death	Known for
Ordinary members
1 (Note: The number shown is the individual's place in the wider order of appointment since the Order of New Zealand's inception.)	Sir Arnold Nordmeyer; ONZ KCMG		6 February 1987	2 February 1989	Minister of Finance
2	C. E. Beeby; ONZ CMG		6 February 1987	10 March 1998	Educationalist
3	Dame Te Atairangikaahu; ONZ DBE OStJ		6 February 1987	15 August 2006	Māori Queen (Kīngitanga)
4	Sir Edmund Hillary; KG ONZ KBE		6 February 1987	11 January 2008	First official ascent of Mount Everest
5	Sonja Davies; ONZ JP		6 February 1987	12 June 2005	Trade union leader and politician
6	Jim Knox; ONZ JP		6 February 1988	1 December 1991	Trade union leader
7	Frederick Turnovsky; ONZ OBE		6 February 1988	12 December 1994	Manufacturer and arts leader
8	Richard Matthews; ONZ		6 February 1988	19 February 1995	Microbiologist
9	Douglas Lilburn; ONZ		6 February 1988	6 June 2001	Composer
10	June, Lady Blundell; ONZ QSO GCStJ		6 February 1988	31 October 2012	Viceregal consort
11	Manuhuia Bennett; ONZ CMG		6 February 1989	20 December 2001	Anglican bishop
12	Henry Lang; ONZ CB		6 February 1989	17 April 1997	Economist
13	Dame Whina Cooper; ONZ DBE		15 June 1991	26 March 1994	Māori leader
14	Jack Somerville; ONZ CMG MC ChStJ		15 June 1991	5 October 1999	Presbyterian leader
15	Whetu Tirikatene-Sullivan; ONZ		6 February 1993	20 July 2011	Politician
16	Margaret Mahy; ONZ		6 February 1993	23 July 2012	Children's author
17	Dame Miriam Dell; ONZ DBE JP		6 February 1993	22 March 2022	Women's welfare
18	Sir Thaddeus McCarthy; ONZ KBE		6 February 1994	11 April 2001	President of the Court of Appeal
19	Sir Roy McKenzie; ONZ KBE		17 June 1995	1 September 2007	Philanthropist
20	Sir Miles Warren; ONZ KBE		17 June 1995	9 August 2022	Architect
21	Sir James Fletcher; ONZ		2 June 1997	29 August 2007	Industrialist
22	Ivan Lichter; ONZ		2 June 1997	15 June 2009	Surgeon
23	Jim Bolger; ONZ PC		31 December 1997	15 October 2025	Prime Minister
24	Cliff Whiting; ONZ		31 December 1998	16 July 2017	Artist
25	Ken Douglas; ONZ		31 December 1998	14 September 2022	Trade union leader
26	Mike Moore; ONZ AO PC		31 December 1999	2 February 2020	Prime Minister
27	Tom Williams; ONZ ChStJ		5 June 2000	22 December 2023	Emeritus Catholic Archbishop of Wellington
28	Alan MacDiarmid; ONZ		31 December 2001	7 February 2007	Chemist, Nobel laureate
29	David Lange; ONZ CH PC		2 June 2003	13 August 2005	Prime Minister
30	Jonathan Hunt; ONZ PC		31 December 2004	8 March 2024	Speaker of the House of Representatives
31	Dame Doreen Blumhardt; ONZ DNZM CBE		30 December 2006	17 October 2009	Ceramicist
32	Sir Lloyd Geering; ONZ GNZM CBE		30 December 2006	5 November 2026	Theologian
33	Sir Kenneth Keith; ONZ KBE KC PC		4 June 2007	13 May 2026	Jurist and legal scholar
34	Sir Murray Halberg; ONZ MBE		2 June 2008	30 November 2022	Olympic runner
35	Ralph Hotere; ONZ		31 December 2011	24 February 2013	Artist
Additional members
1	Sir Guy Powles; ONZ KBE CMG ED		6 February 1990	24 October 1994	Public servant and diplomat
2	Allen Curnow; ONZ CBE		6 February 1990	23 September 2001	Poet
3	Queen Elizabeth The Queen Mother; LG LT ONZ GCVO GBE CI CC RRC CD		6 February 1990	30 March 2002	Mother of Elizabeth II, Queen of New Zealand
4	Janet Frame; ONZ CBE		6 February 1990	29 January 2004	Author
5	Arthur Lydiard; ONZ OBE		6 February 1990	11 December 2004	Athletics coach
6	Dame Ann Ballin; ONZ DBE		3 June 2002	2 September 2003	Psychologist
7	The Lord Cooke of Thorndon; ONZ KBE PC QC		3 June 2002	30 August 2006	Jurist
8	Sir Hugh Kāwharu; ONZ		3 June 2002	19 September 2006	Māori leader
9	Dame Catherine Tizard; ONZ GCMG GCVO DBE QSO DStJ		3 June 2002	31 October 2021	Governor-General of New Zealand
10	Sir Paul Reeves; ONZ GCMG GCVO QSO KStJ		6 February 2007	14 August 2011	Anglican bishop and governor-general
11	Sir Owen Woodhouse; ONZ KBE DSC PC		6 February 2007	15 April 2014	Jurist
12	Sir Brian Lochore; ONZ KNZM OBE		6 February 2007	3 August 2019	Rugby union player and coach
13	The Duke of Edinburgh; KG KT OM ONZ GCVO GBE AK QSO PC		4 June 2012	9 April 2021	Consort of Elizabeth II, Queen of New Zealand
Honorary members
1	Sir Shridath Ramphal; ONZ OE GCMG OCC AC KC		6 February 1990	30 August 2024	Commonwealth Secretary-General
2	Bill Pickering; ONZ KBE		2 June 2003	15 March 2004	Rocket scientist
