= Keith Hunter (chemist) =

New Zealand ocean chemist (1951–2018)

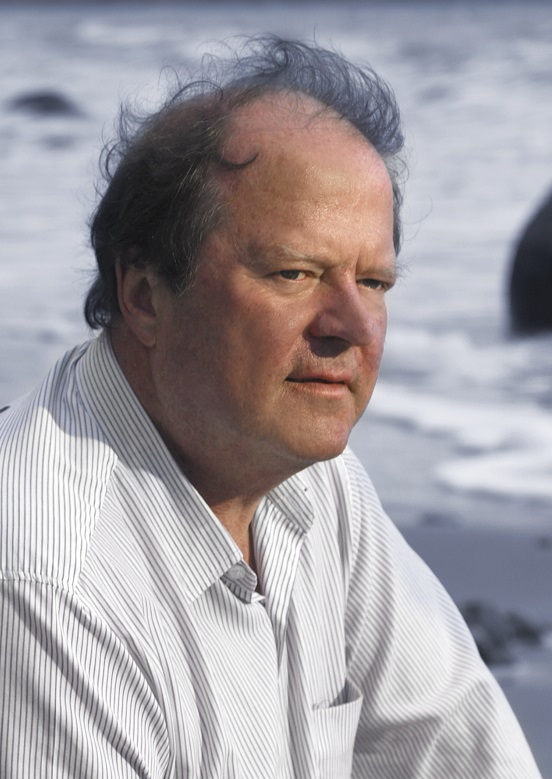
- Hunter in 2007
- Born: Keith Andrew Hunter; 24 November 1951
- Died: 24 October 2018 (aged 66); Dunedin, New Zealand
- Education: University of Auckland; University of East Anglia
- Awards: Marsden Medal (2014)
- Scientific career
- Fields: Ocean chemistry
- Workplaces: University of Otago
- Thesis: Chemistry of the sea surface microlayer (1977)
- Doctoral students: Tuifuisa’a Patila Amosa

Keith Andrew Hunter (24 November 1951 – 24 October 2018) was a New Zealand ocean chemist who was a professor of chemistry and pro-vice-chancellor of sciences, at the University of Otago.

== Biography ==
Born on 24 November 1951, Hunter was the son of Nevin Lindsay Hunter and Othle May Hunter (née Brenton). He was educated at Auckland Grammar School, graduated from the University of Auckland with a first-class degree in chemistry in 1974, and completed his PhD at the University of East Anglia in 1977. He then spent a year at the French Atomic Energy Commission.

Hunter joined the Department of Chemistry at the University of Otago as a lecturer in 1979, rising to become a full professor in 1994. His research focused on trace metals in natural waters, particularly in the ocean, and chemical equilibria in marine and freshwater systems. He found that the productivity of phytoplankton in much of the oceans is limited by the availability of iron.

Hunter served a term as president of the New Zealand Institute of Chemistry, and was involved in the establishment of the NIWA/University of Otago Joint Institute for Oceanography in 1996. He was awarded the Prime Minister's Science Prize in 2011 and the Marsden Medal in 2014, and was elected a Fellow of the Royal Society of New Zealand in 1997.

Hunter retired as pro vice chancellor of sciences at Otago in 2016 after six years in the position, and died at his home in Dunedin on 24 October 2018.

Notable students of Hunter include Tuifuisaʻa Patila Amosa.
