= Richard Matthews (microbiologist) =

New Zealand microbiologist (1921–1995)

Richard Matthews ONZ FRS FRSNZ
- Born: 20 November 1921; Hamilton, New Zealand
- Died: 19 February 1995 (aged 73); Auckland, New Zealand
- Education: Auckland University College (MSc); Emmanuel College, Cambridge (PhD)
- Scientific career
- Fields: Plant virology
- Workplaces: Department of Scientific and Industrial Research; University of Auckland
- Thesis: (1948)

Richard Ellis Ford Matthews ONZ (20 November 1921 – 19 February 1995) was a New Zealand plant virologist.

== Biography ==
Matthews was born in Hamilton in 1921. He grew up in Mount Albert, and was educated at Owairaka School and Mount Albert Grammar School in Auckland. He then attended Auckland University College, graduating with a Master of Science degree with second-class honours in 1942.

After serving in the 7th Antitank Regiment of the 2nd New Zealand Expeditionary Force in Italy from 1943 to 1945, Matthews undertook PhD studies at Emmanuel College, Cambridge, graduating in 1948. He was appointed senior mycologist at the New Zealand Department of Scientific and Industrial Research in 1954 and senior principal research officer in 1956. In 1962, he was appointed professor of microbiology at the University of Auckland, retiring in 1987.

Matthews was elected a Fellow of the Royal Society of New Zealand in 1962, and in 1978 he was awarded the Hector Medal. He was elected a Fellow of the Royal Society in 1974. On 6 February 1988, Matthews was appointed a Member of the Order of New Zealand.

He died in Auckland on 19 February 1995.
