= 2007 New Year Honours (New Zealand) =

Annual awards for New Zealanders

- Previous: 2006 New Zealand bravery awards Next: 2007 Special Honours
- Type: New Zealand royal honours: Order of New Zealand; New Zealand Order of Merit; Queen's Service Order; Queen's Service Medal; New Zealand Antarctic Medal
- Date: 30 December 2006
- Country: New Zealand
- Total recipients: 198

The 2007 New Year Honours in New Zealand were appointments by Elizabeth II in her right as Queen of New Zealand, on the advice of the New Zealand government, to various orders and honours to reward and highlight good works by New Zealanders, and to celebrate the passing of 2006 and the beginning of 2007. They were announced on 30 December 2006.

The recipients of honours are listed here as they were styled before their new honour.

== Order of New Zealand (ONZ) ==
Ordinary member

- Dr Vera Doreen Blumhardt DCNZM CBE – of Wellington
- Emeritus Professor Lloyd George Geering PCNZM CBE – of Wellington
Vera Blumhardt

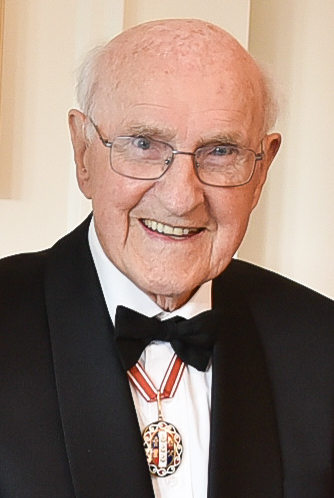
Lloyd Geering

== New Zealand Order of Merit ==
=== Distinguished Companion (DCNZM) ===
- Maurice John Belgrave – of Wellington. For public services, lately as chief ombudsman.
- Professor Margaret Clark CMG JP – of Wellington. For services to education.
- The Honourable John Joseph McGrath – of Wellington. For services to the Appeal and Supreme Courts of New Zealand.
- Nigel John Dermot (Sam) Neill OBE – of Queenstown. For services to acting.
- Tennant Edward (Tay) Wilson OBE – of Lower Hutt. For services to the Olympic and Commonwealth Games.
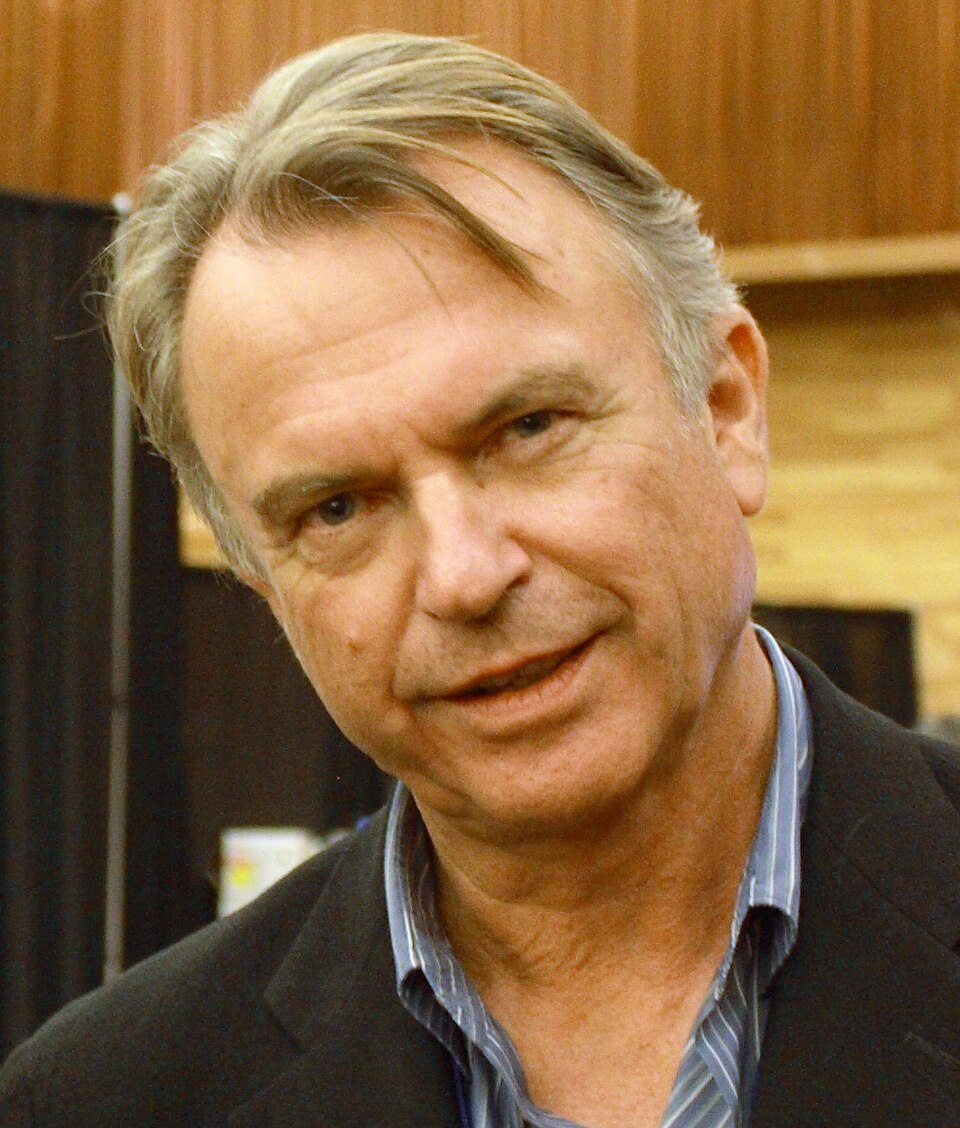
Sam Neill

=== Companion (CNZM) ===
- Colin John Bennet Dale JP – of Manukau. For services to local government.
- Barrie Patrick Everard – of Auckland. For services to the film industry.
- Howard Edward Fancy – of Wellington. For public services, lately as Secretary of Education.
- Ian Ferguson Farrant – of Wānaka. For services to business and the community.
- Graham Fortune – of Wellington. For public services, lately as Secretary of Defence.
- Emeritus Professor Graeme Stuart Fraser – of Palmerston North. For services to education and the community.
- Basil Manderson Logan – of Upper Hutt. For services to business and government.
- Distinguished Professor David Anthony Dougall Parry – of Palmerston North. For services to biophysics.
- Mary Anne Schnackenberg – of Auckland. For services to people with visual impairments.
- Professor Anne Briar Smith – of Dunedin. For services to children.
- The Honourable James Robert Sutton – of Wainuiomata. For public services as a member of Parliament and minister of the Crown.
- Gordon Frederick Tietjens MNZM – of Tauranga. For services to rugby.
- Edward Richard Woods – of Wellington. For public services, lately as director of the New Zealand Security Intelligence Service.
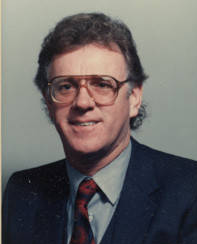
Colin Dale

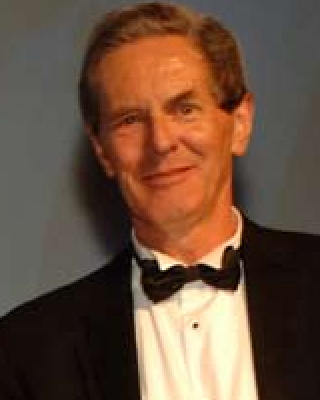
David Parry

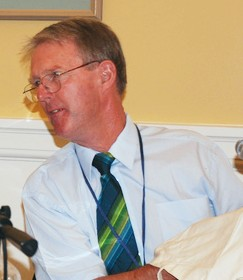
Jim Sutton

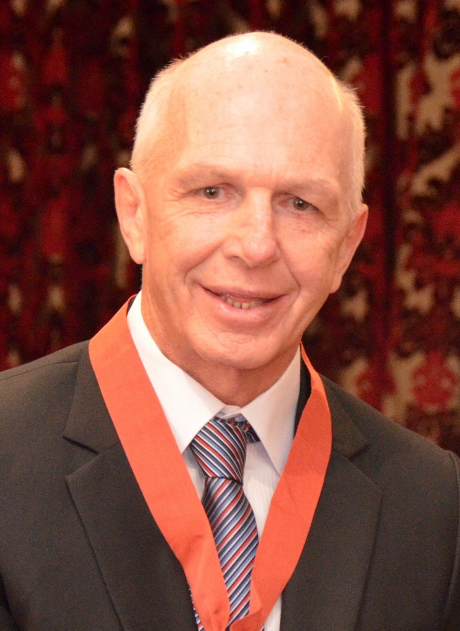
Gordon Tietjens

=== Officer (ONZM) ===
- Professor Robert Donald Anderson – of Palmerston North. For services to science, education and cricket.
- Peter Gregg Arnett – of McLean, Virginia, United States of America. For services to journalism.
- Venkataraman Balakrishnan – of Wellington. For services to medicine.
- Sister Winefride Marie Blake QSM – of Wellington. For services to music education.
- Chung Yock (Dan) Chan QSM – of Wellington. For services to the Chinese community.
- Dr David Peter Clews – of Hamilton. For services to orthopaedics and the community.
- Leslie William Curtin – of North Shore. For services to marine fisheries.
- Frank Morris Endacott – of Kaiapoi. For services to rugby league.
- Professor Emeritus Roger Curtis Green – of Waitakere. For services to New Zealand history.
- Claire Elizabeth Hague – of Napier. For services to education.
- Antony Brian Hambrook – of Auckland. For services to the marine industry.
- Paul Moore Hargreaves – of Auckland. For services to business and the community.
- Jennifer Susan May – of Christchurch. For services to heritage conservation.
- Dr Robert Miller – of Dunedin. For services to schizophrenia research.
- Dr Farah Rangikoepa Palmer – of Palmerston North. For services to women's rugby and sport.
- Jeremy David Pope – of Wellington. For services to international affairs.
- Anthony George Popplewell – of North Shore. For services to rowing and sports administration.
- Professor Ivan Leon Reilly – of Auckland. For services to mathematics.
- Dr Satendra Kumar Singh QSM JP – of Auckland. For services to the Indian community.
- Robert John Stewart – of Christchurch. For services to manufacturing and the community.
- Vincent Ward – of Auckland. For services to film.
- Jennifer Cecily Ward-Lealand – of Auckland. For services to the theatre and the community.
- Brigadier Mark Wheeler – Brigadiers' List, New Zealand Army
- Carol Kate Guiniven White – of Auckland. For services to education.

Additional

- Lieutenant Commander Wayne Bruce Burtton – Royal New Zealand Navy. For military operational service.
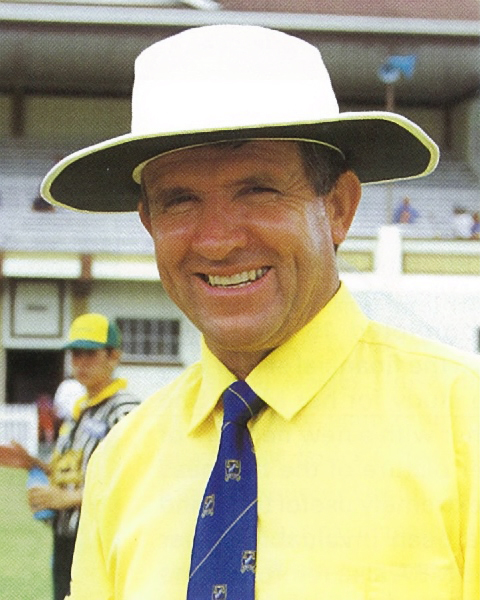
Robert Anderson

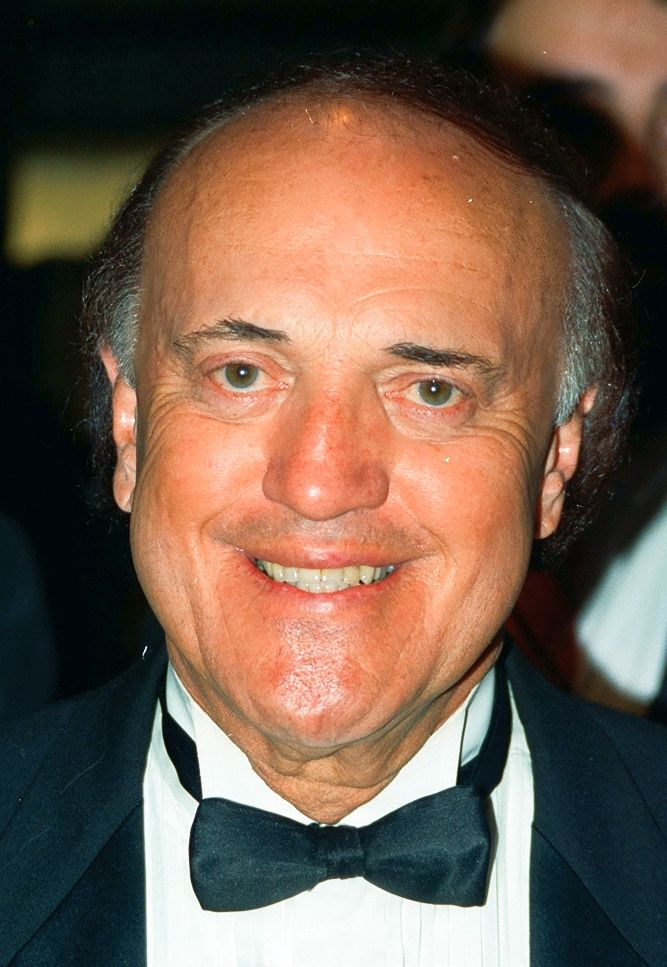
Peter Arnett

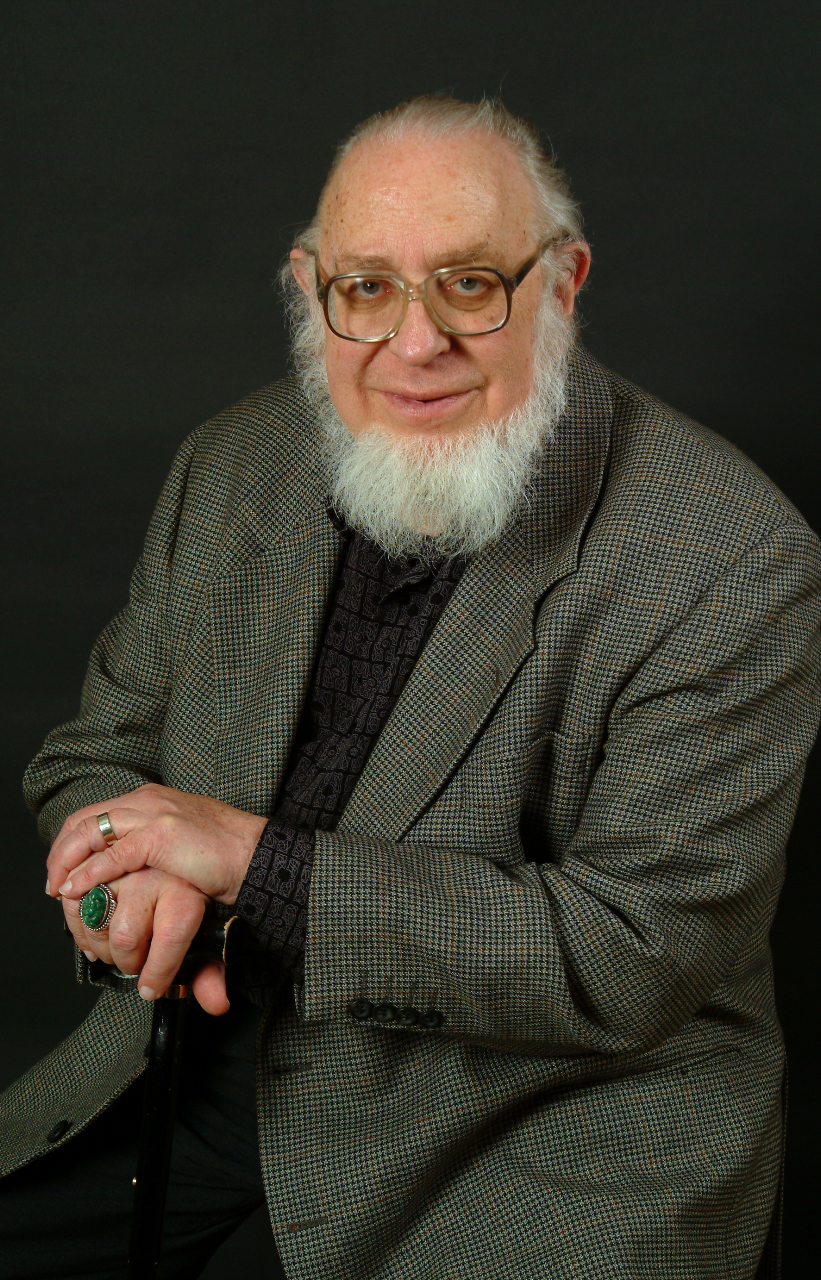
Roger Green

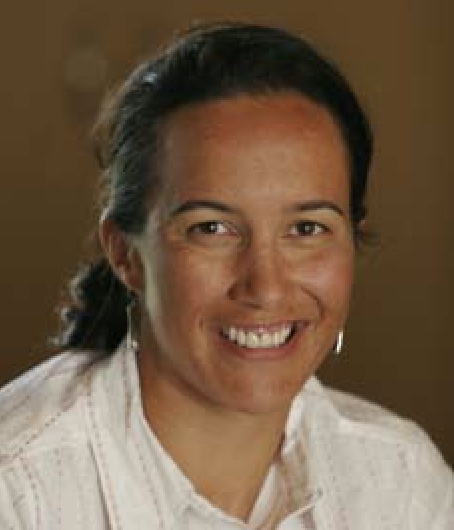
Farah Palmer

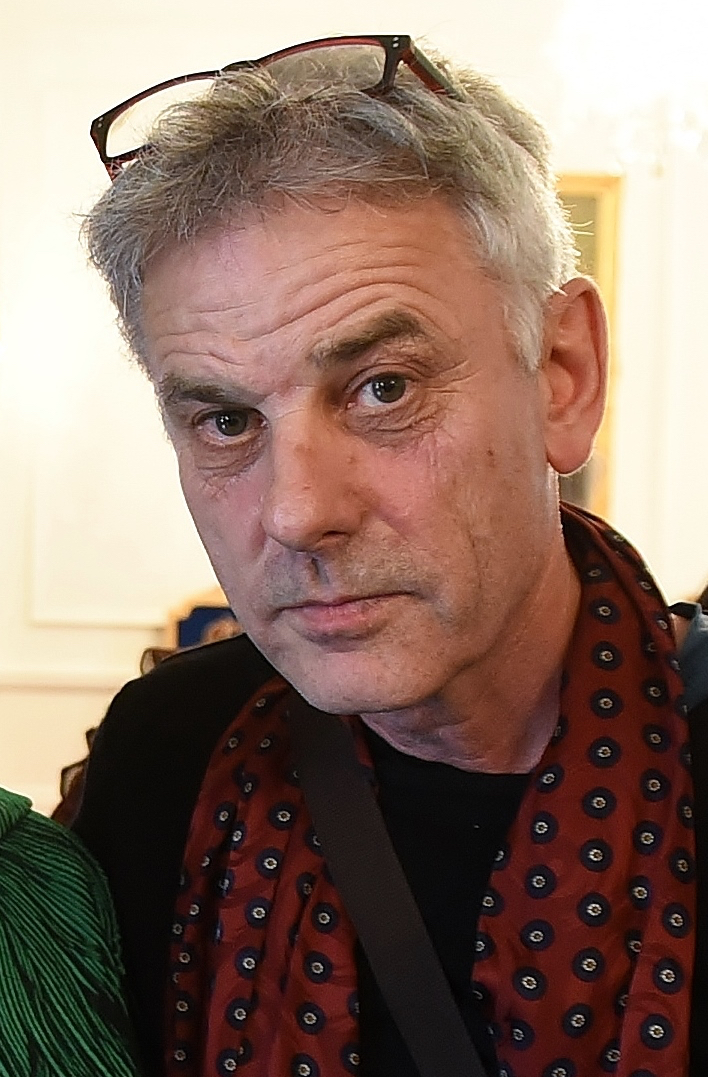
Vincent Ward

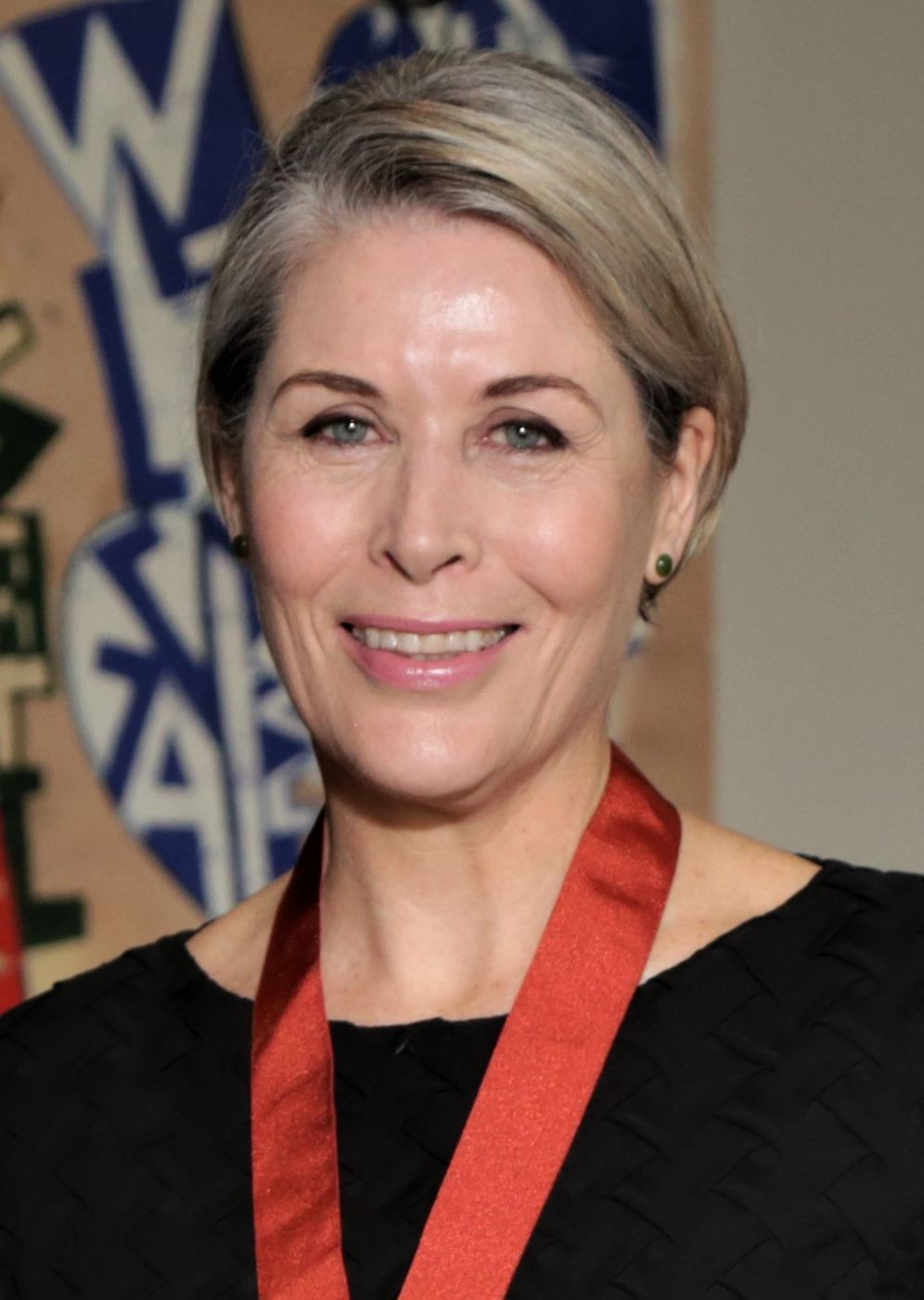
Jennifer Ward-Lealand

=== Member (MNZM) ===
- Dr Jack Stanford Allan – of Hamilton. For services to education.
- David Roger Bates – of Tūrangi. For services to search and rescue.
- Alistair Oliphant Beckett – of Wellington; superintendent, New Zealand Police. For services to the New Zealand Police.
- Dr Patrick Jerome Beehan – of Hamilton. For services to plastic surgery and the community.
- Major Gordon William Benfell – Royal New Zealand Infantry Regiment.
- James Bennett JP – of Hamilton. For services to education.
- William Wakefield Bishop – of North Shore; detective superintendent, New Zealand Police. For services to the New Zealand Police.
- Janice Mary Bowman – of Auckland. For services to the community.
- Lieutenant Commander Barbara Elizabeth Cassin – Royal New Zealand Navy.
- Raewyn Phoebe Clark JP – of Manukau. For services to the community.
- Gerald Lynn Te Kapa Coates – of Wellington. For services to engineering.
- Nicolette Mary Darlow JP – of Wellington. For services to the community.
- Tenick Carr Dennison – of Masterton. For services to conservation.
- Heather Joyce Dodunski JP – of New Plymouth. For services to dairy farming and the community.
- Andrew Raymond Drummond – of Christchurch. For services to sculpture.
- Warwick Francis Duell – of Christchurch. For services to the Department of Corrections.
- Gaynor Mary Eaton – of Dunedin. For services to embroidery.
- Dr Denis Hugo Friedlander – of Hamilton. For services to medicine.
- Robert Henry Glading DSC – of North Shore. For services to golf.
- Peter Harold Goodman – of Motueka. For services to business and the community.
- Sandra Greig – of Christchurch. For services to ballet and dance.
- Colin James Hammond JP – of Whakatāne. For services to the community.
- Marion Ann Hancock – of Auckland. For services to peace education.
- Bryan Hector Heron – of Waitakere. For services to the community.
- Dr Elsie Seckyee Ho – of Hamilton. For services to the migrant community.
- Peter Edward Kerridge JP – of Greymouth. For services to rugby league and the community.
- William Thomas Leathwick – of Manukau. For services to broadcasting, television and the community.
- Ali'itasi Pepe Lemalu JP – of Dunedin. For services to the Pacific Islands community.
- Malcolm David MacKenzie – of Winton. For services to conservation.
- Keith Stuart Mann – of Christchurch. For services to sport, in particular fencing.
- Jocelyn Mary Marshall JP – of Hamilton. For services to the community.
- Mervyn Charles Martin JP – of New Plymouth. For services to the community.
- Katie Isabel Morgan – of Napier. For services to conservation.
- Suzanne Ngaire Muirhead – of Wellington. For services to women's hockey.
- Barbara Graham Cargill Murison – of Wellington. For services to children's literature.
- Sheila Ellen Natusch – of Wellington. For services as a writer and illustrator.
- Tamati Maungarangi Paraone – of Kawakawa. For services to Māori.
- Dr Dennis Louis Pezaro – of Wānaka. For services to community health.
- Dr Chula Niranjan Ajasath Rajapakse – of Lower Hutt. For services to rheumatology and the Sri Lankan community.
- Adrian Charles Riegen – of Waitakere. For services to conservation.
- Associate Professor Peter Larry Schwartz – of Dunedin. For services to medical education.
- Harris Heremaia Shortland JP – of Porirua. For services to the Department of Corrections.
- Simon James Towns – of London, United Kingdom. For services to hockey.
- William John Townsend JP – of Naseby. For services to rugby and the community.
- Lieutenant Colonel Darryl James Tracy – Royal New Zealand Infantry Regiment.
- Miniata Te Rito Westrupp – of Gisborne. For services to te reo Māori and the community.
- Dr Allan Neil White AE – of Tauranga. For services to medicine and the community.
- Commander Mathew Charles Williams – Royal New Zealand Navy.
- Simon John Williamson – of North Shore. For services to the New Zealand Customs Service.
- Juliet Mai Yates – of Auckland. For services to local-body affairs and the community.

Additional

- Captain Neville Douglas Mosley – Corps of Royal New Zealand Engineers. For military operational service.
- Acting Captain Mark August Sydney – Corps of Royal New Zealand Military Police. For military operational service.

Honorary

- Frederick Shaw Benson III – of Alexandria, Virginia, United States of America. For services to New Zealand–United States relations.
- Hiroshi Ohashi – of Hyōgo, Japan. For services to education.
- Jorge Artemio Sandoval-Medina – of Lower Hutt. For services to cycling.
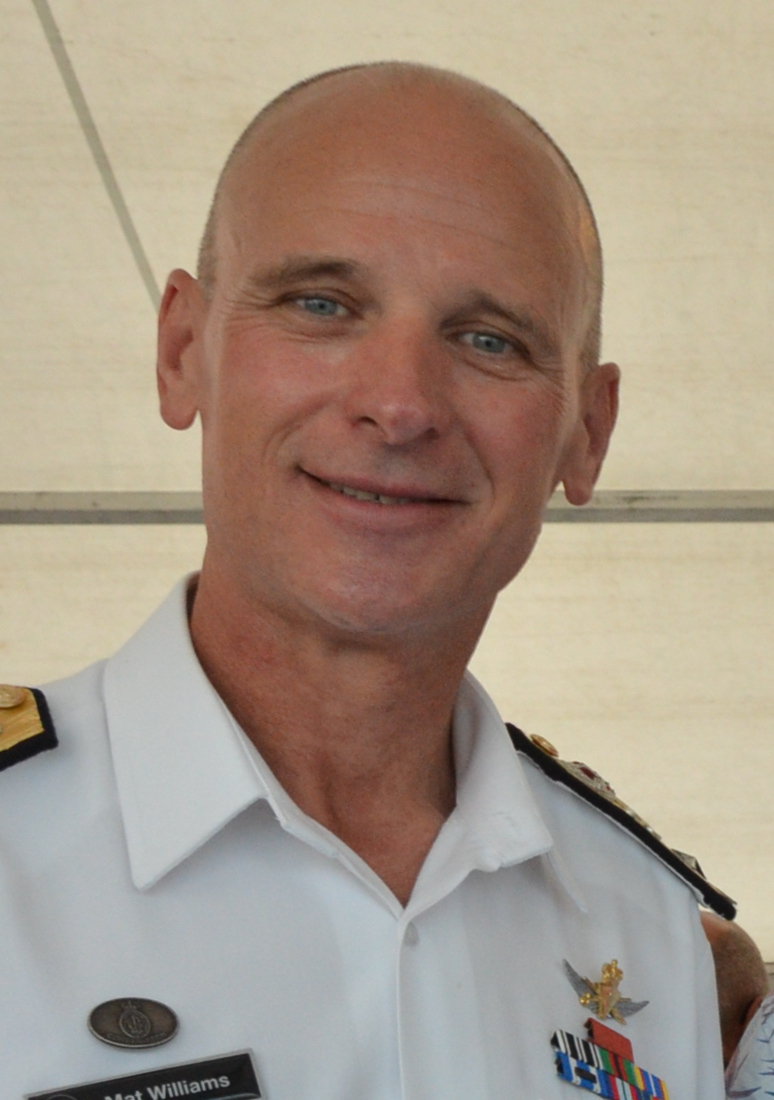
Commander Mat Williams

== Companion of the Queen's Service Order (QSO) ==
=== For community service ===
- William Bernard Boyd – of Manukau
- Gavin John Anthony Kerr JP – of Blenheim
- Constance Joy Owens – of Mt Maunganui
- David John Russell – of Wellington
- Robin Lindsey Shepherd – of Kaitaia
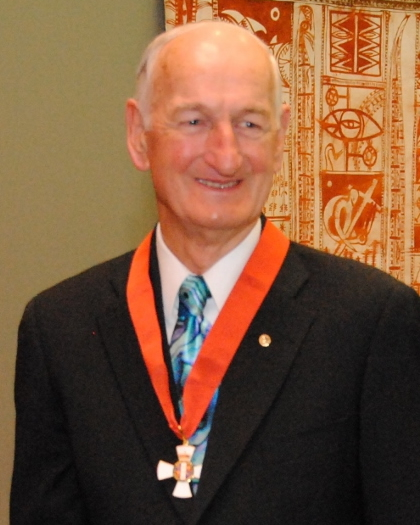
Bill Boyd

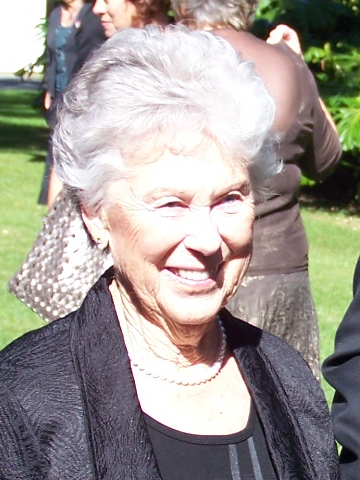
Joy Owens

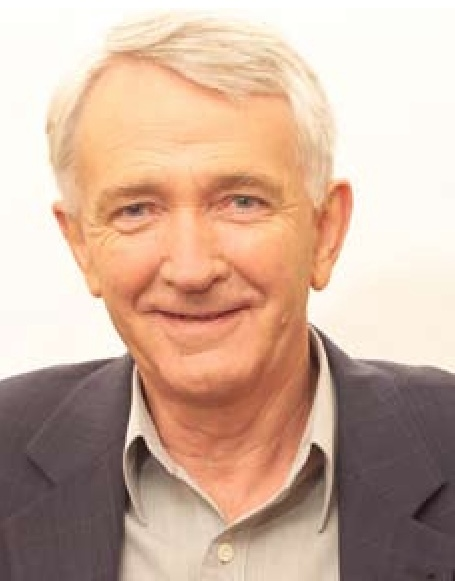
David Russell

=== For public services ===
- Salvatore Vincent Gargiulo – of Nelson
- Dr Margaret Edith Catherine Honeyman – of North Shore
- Rae Scott Julian – of Wellington
- Alison Margaret McAlpine JP – of Nelson
- Laurence Jeremy Elder Salmond – of North Shore
- The Honourable William Robson Storey – of Huntly
- Dr Gillian Joy Tasker – of Wellington
- Dr Michael Eric Upcott Taylor – of Waikanae

== Queen's Service Medal (QSM) ==
=== For community service ===
- Philip Andrews – of Rotorua
- Elizabeth Margaret Bayliss – of Whakatāne
- Thomas Frank Bayliss – of Whakatāne
- William David Blake – of Nūhaka
- Linda Blincko – of North Shore
- Mary Christine Burdon – of Rotorua
- Benjamin de Thierry – of Wellsford
- Edna Vivian Mary Downey – of Palmerston North
- Roy Gardiner – of Hastings
- Tautini Moana Glover – of Gisborne
- John Stewart Grace – of Lower Hutt
- Daniel Joseph Harris – of Ōkaihau
- Seyed Hassan Hosseini JP – of Waitakere
- Eileen Margaret Langridge – of Christchurch
- Ngov Dun Meng Ly – of Manukau
- Robert Frederick Lynn – of Ashburton
- Geraldine Clare Madden – of Masterton
- Taulapapa Moemoeolemalotumua Mata'afa Faumuina Mulitalo – of Manukau
- Christina Mary, Lady McCombs – of Christchurch
- Dr Paula Marjorie McKellar – of New Plymouth
- Brian Dempster Mellar – of Thames
- Francis Victor Morine JP – of New Plymouth
- Marlene Nora Mulholland – of Wellington
- Narayana Sankaran Nair – of Auckland
- Haerenga Noa Nicholson – of Dannevirke
- Sinahemotutama Utalo Panama – of Manukau
- Zeta Marie Reilly – of Tākaka
- Jean Euphemia Finlayson (Jinty) Rorke – of Tauranga
- Jessie Petrova Seaman – of Raetihi
- Annette Mary Skeen – of Taupō
- Marie Alice Stothart – of Hastings
- Michael Joseph Tahere – of Kāpiti. Senior constable, New Zealand Police.
- Dr Nyunt Naing Thein – of Auckland
- Jennie Beverley Thomas – of Whangamatā
- Elizabeth Tierney – of Taihape
- Captain Keith Alfred James Tremain JP – Salvation Army (Retired), of Hastings
- Leslie Philip Walden – of Feilding
- Leah Leslie Watson – of Kerikeri
- Graham Charles Watton JP – of Paeroa
- Dr Owen Ralph Wiles – of Tokoroa
- Margaret Florence Mina Wilson – of Mosgiel
- George Wong – of Dunedin

=== For public services ===
- Patricia Eleanor Beck – of Greymouth
- Alan Frederick Bines – of Rotorua
- Jennifer Elizabeth Brain – of Whangārei
- Raymond Barry Clarke – of Waitakere
- Alan James Clearwater – of Palmerston. Lately chief fire officer, Palmerston Volunteer Fire Brigade.
- Douglas John Cowan – of Kaiapoi
- Preston Bryce Craig JP – of Ōpōtiki
- Mark Gregory Davidson – of Paraparaumu Beach. Senior Sergeant, New Zealand Police.
- Yvonne Duncan – of North Shore
- Helen Catherine Gatonyi – of Christchurch
- James Edward John Guyton – of Mossburn. Chief fire officer, Mossburn Volunteer Fire Brigade.
- Barry Alexander Hartley – of New Plymouth
- Dr Susan Jennifer Jarvis – of Christchurch
- Glenys Keys – of Manukau
- Averil Ada Langrell – of Geraldine
- Gail Elizabeth Loane – of Ngarimu Bay
- Mary Bernadette Te-Vaine Tura Manumea – of Auckland
- Lyvia Marama Marsden – of North Shore
- Vivienne Anne Marshall – of Christchurch
- David John McFarlane – of Renwick. Chief fire officer, Renwick Fire District.
- Ronald Charles Noice – of Cambridge
- Philip Gary Palfrey – of Manukau
- Kenneth Fredrick Parker – of Manukau. Chief fire officer, Bucklands Volunteer Fire Brigade.
- Malcolm John Pearson – of Wellington
- Professor Peter Douglas Kenneth Ramsay – of Hamilton
- Kevin Michael Reilly – of Palmerston North
- Shona Margaret Robb JP – of Lower Hutt
- Margaret Alice Robson – of Christchurch
- Peter Rushworth – of Auckland
- Cameron Brant Shaw – of Taumarunui. Detective sergeant, New Zealand Police.
- Elaine Simons – of Manukau
- Eru Mahia Smith – of Te Karaka
- Nora Van der Schrieck – of Papakura
- Karen Margaret Vaughan – of Wellington. Senior constable, New Zealand Police.
- David Graeme Walker – of Waitakere. Inspector, New Zealand Police.
- Raymond Frederick Walker – of Woodville. Lately chief fire officer, Woodville Volunteer Fire Brigade.
- Ronald Lancelot Walker – of Invercargill
- Ellen Nan Watts – of Christchurch

Honorary

- Theresia Magdalena Elisabeth van Ree – of Lower Hutt
- Willem van Ree – of Lower Hutt

== New Zealand Antarctic Medal (NZAM) ==
- Professor John Dudley Bradshaw – of Christchurch. For services to Antarctic science.
- Dr Clive Howard-Williams – of Christchurch. For services to Antarctic science.

Honorary

- Dr Karl Erb – of Kensington, Maryland, United States of America. For services to New Zealand Antarctic programmes.
