= Roslyn Kemp =

New Zealand immunologist

- Awards: Miriam Dell Award for Excellence in Science Mentoring

Academic work
- Institutions: University of Otago, University of Oxford, Trudeau Institute

Roslyn A. Kemp is a New Zealand immunologist, and as at 2024 is a full professor at the University of Otago. Her research focuses on T cells, mucosal and tumour immune responses, inflammation and T cell memory.

== Academic career ==
Kemp completed a Bachelor of Science in microbiology at the University of Otago. She then earned a PhD in pathology and molecular medicine at the Wellington School of Medicine and the Malaghan Institute. Kemp undertook postdoctoral work at the Trudeau Institute in the USA and at Oxford University before returning to New Zealand. She joined the faculty of the department of biochemistry at Otago in 2008, then the Department of Microbiology and Immunology in 2009, rising to associate professor in 2017 and full professor in 2021.

Kemp's research focuses on cancer and inflammation, specifically the role of T cells and myeloid cells in mediating immunity to tumours. She investigates the molecular signalling pathways in T cells, and the role that T cells play within immune responses to tumours and inflammatory bowel disease. Her research is aimed at finding ways to prevent, diagnose and treat cancer, particularly colorectal cancer. Kemp uses multiplex imaging and mass cytometry in her work.

Kemp is part of the Maurice Wilkins Centre for Molecular Biodiscovery, and was associate dean research in the Division of Health Sciences at Otago 2021-23.

== Honours and awards ==
Kemp was awarded the Miriam Dell Award for science mentoring by the Association for Women in Science in 2015, with her nomination saying "she has an inclusive and unselfish approach to mentoring, with a special emphasis on supporting young female Maori students into postgraduate study." Kemp wrote a book with Deborah M. Brown, How to be a scientist: critical thinking in the life sciences published in 2023 by Garland Science.

Kemp was the University of Otago Supervisor of the Year in 2013 and 2020.

== Selected works ==
- Kemp, Roslyn A.; F. Ronchese (2001). "Tumor-Specific Tc1, But Not Tc2, Cells Deliver Protective Antitumor Immunity" (PDF). Journal of Immunology. 167 (11): 6497–6502. doi:10.4049/jimmunol.167.11.6497. PMID 11714817. Wikidata Q54717158.
- Tatyana Chtanova; Kemp, Roslyn A.; Sutherland, Andrew; F Ronchese; C R Mackay (2001). "Gene microarrays reveal extensive differential gene expression in both CD4(+) and CD8(+) type 1 and type 2 T cells". Journal of Immunology. 167 (6): 3057–3063. doi:10.4049/jimmunol.167.6.3057. PMID 11544289. Wikidata Q74481512.
- Kirsten A Ward-Hartstonge; Kemp, Roslyn A. (2017). "Regulatory T-cell heterogeneity and the cancer immune response". Clinical & Translational Immunology. 6 (9): e154. doi:10.1038/cti.2017.43. PMC 5628269. PMID 28983402. Wikidata Q42102497.
- Dawn M Jelley-Gibbs; John P Dibble; Svetlana Filipson; Laura Haynes; Kemp, Roslyn A.; Swain, Susan (2005). "Repeated stimulation of CD4 effector T cells can limit their protective function". Journal of Experimental Medicine. 201 (7): 1101–1112. doi:10.1084/jem.20041852. PMC 2213138. PMID 15795235. Wikidata Q36403433.
- Luis Munoz-Erazo; Janet L Rhodes; Valentine C Marion; Kemp, Roslyn A. (2020). "Tertiary lymphoid structures in cancer - considerations for patient prognosis". Cellular and Molecular Immunology. doi:10.1038/s41423-020-0457-0. PMC 7264315. PMID 32415259. Wikidata Q94948731.
- Silke Neumann; Kristina Burkert; Kemp, Roslyn A.; Rades, Thomas; Dunbar, Roderick Peter; Hook, Sarah Margaret (2014). "Activation of the NLRP3 inflammasome is not a feature of all particulate vaccine adjuvants". Immunology & Cell Biology. 92 (6): 535–542. doi:10.1038/icb.2014.21. PMID 24687021. Wikidata Q59234379.
