= Safua Akeli Amaama =

Samoan historian and museum director

- Born: 1982 (age 43–44); Samoa
- Occupations: Historian, academic and museum curator

Togialelei Safua Akeli Amaama (born ~1982) is a Samoan academic. She works as the Head of the Department of Ethnology and Curator Oceania at the Übersee-Museum in Bremen. Formerly she was Head of New Zealand and Pacific Histories and Cultures at Te Papa, the National Museum of New Zealand and is the first Pacific person to hold the role. She is also Adjunct Research Fellow in the Museum and Heritage Studies programme at Victoria University of Wellington in New Zealand and an Associate Researcher for the Centre for Pacific Studies at the University of St Andrews in Scotland.

== Career ==
Amaama left Samoa at the age of five and was raised in New Zealand and Australia. She has family links in Samoa in Tiavea, Vaiala, Samalaeʻulu, and Falese'ela. Amaama obtained a BA degree from the University of Otago, an MA in history from the University of Canterbury in Christchurch, New Zealand, and a PhD in philosophy and history from the University of Queensland in Australia. Her research interests are in cultural heritage, health, migration, gender and governance.

From 2008 to 2013 Amaama worked for Te Papa as curator of Pacific Cultures. She moved to the National University of Samoa in 2015 to join the Centre for Samoan Studies. In 2018 she was appointed Director of the centre, where she oversaw teaching programmes, research projects and community engagement activities. One of her innovations was the use of film for participatory research. In June 2020 she was appointed Head of History and Pacific Cultures at Te Papa.
