= Abigail Smith =

Professor of marine science, University of Otago

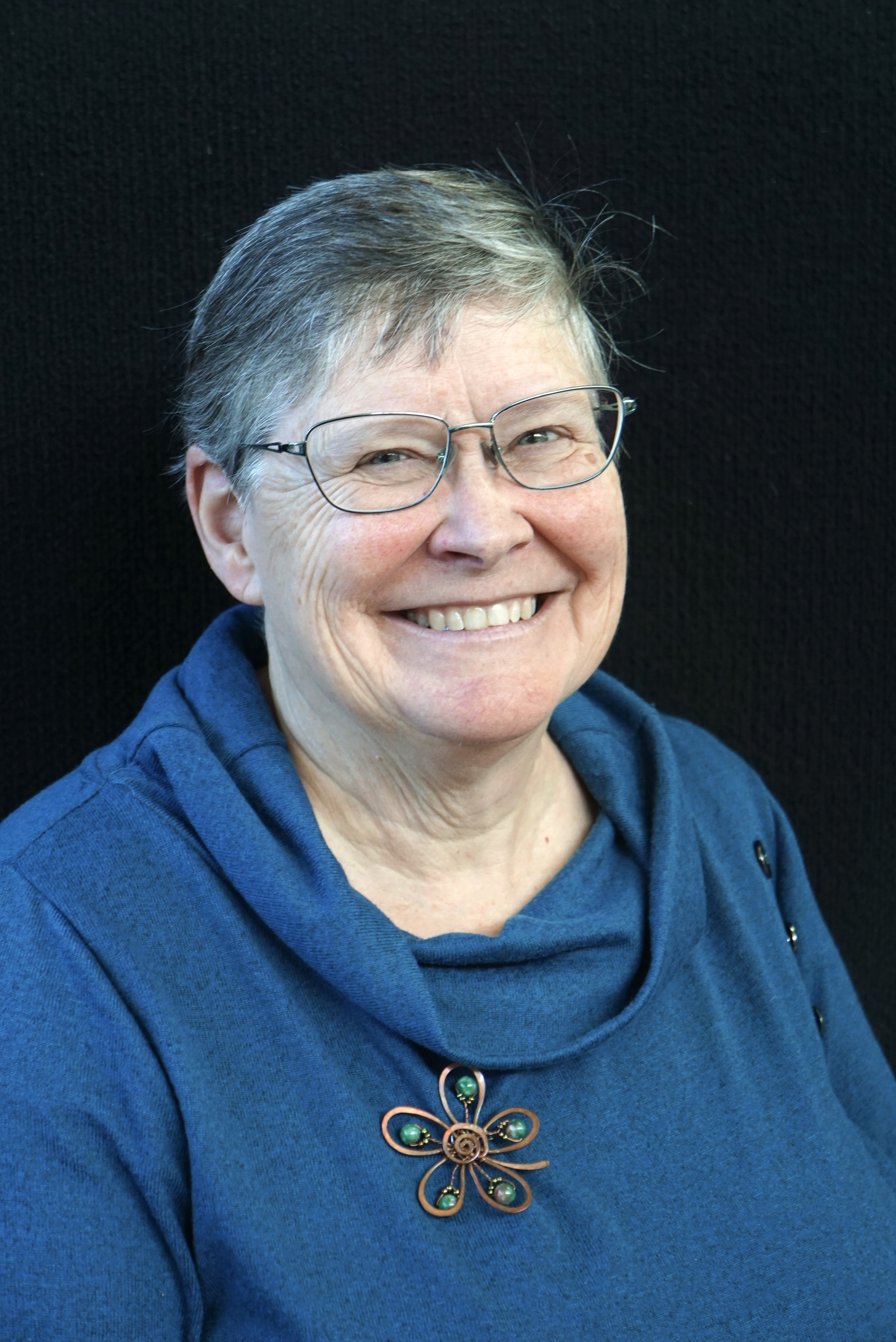
- Smith in 2025
- Education: Waikato University
- Scientific career
- Thesis: Aspects of the sedimentology of New Zealand bryozoans and mixed carbonate-clastic deposits : a contribution to the temperate shelf carbonate model (1992)
- Doctoral students: Tuifuisa’a Patila Amosa

Abigail Marion Smith is an emeritus professor in marine science at the University of Otago in Dunedin.

Smith grew up in New England and did her undergraduate studies at Colby College, graduating in 1982. She completed a Masters degree at Massachusetts Institute of Technology in 1984, after which she met and married her husband, Emeritus Professor Hamish Spencer. In 1988 they moved to New Zealand, where Smith studied for a PhD at Waikato University with Prof Campbell Nelson. She submitted a thesis entitled Aspects of the sedimentology of New Zealand bryozoans and mixed carbonate-clastic deposits: a contribution to the temperate shelf carbonate model and graduated in 1992.

Smith's research is in geo-bio-chemical marine science. She has published over 100 refereed journal articles, as well as contributing a regular popular science article to the Otago Daily Times.

She investigates growth and calcification in marine organisms, especially the relationship of skeletal carbonate composition to environmental and phylogenetic parameters. She has also worked on the fate of biogenic carbonate sediment after deposition, with particular reference to ocean acidification. Much of her research has focussed on the marine phylum Bryozoa.

In October 2019, Smith won the Miriam Dell Award for Excellence in Science Mentoring from the Association for Women in Science. Smith's notable students include Tuifuisaʻa Patila Amosa.
