= List of Samoans =

This is a list of Samoans on Wikipedia in alphabetical order by occupation.

== Architecture ==
- Carinnya Feaunati
- Elisapeta Heta

== Arts and literature ==
- Tusiata Avia
- Serie Barford
- Joseph Churchward
- Fatu Feu'u
- Sia Figiel
- Ioana Gordon-Smith
- Niki Hastings-McFall
- Shigeyuki Kihara
- Lily Laita
- Janet Lilo
- Savea Sano Malifa
- Dan Taulapapa McMullin
- Courtney Sina Meredith
- Josefa Moe
- Lino Nelisi
- Sua Sulu'ape Paulo II
- Johnny Penisula
- Sapa'u Ruperake Petaia
- Lemi Ponifasio
- Greg Semu
- Leilani Tamu
- Teuane Tibbo
- Angela Tiatia
- Michel Tuffery
- Momoe Malietoa Von Reiche
- Albert Wendt
- Lani Wendt Young

== Business ==
- Emma Coe
- Monica Galetti
- Aggie Grey
- Alexia Hilbertidou
- Maposua Rudolf Keil
- Gustavia Lui
- Olaf Frederick Nelson
- Matai’a Lynn Netzler
- Tupua Fred Wetzell

== Education ==
- Donna Rose Addis
- Barbara Ala'alatoa
- Tuifuisa’a Patila Amosa
- Mary Elizabeth Brown
- Peggy Fairbairn-Dunlop
- Brianna Fruean
- Aiono Fanaafi Le Tagaloa
- Salu Hunkin-Finau
- Julia Ioane
- Tania Ka'ai
- Tuala Falenaoti Tiresa Malietoa
- Folole Muliaga
- Dawn Rasmussen
- Rosalina Richards
- Damon Salesa
- Tofā Sauni
- Fuiono Senio
- Caroline Sinavaiana-Gabbard
- Aiono Fanaafi Le Tagaloa
- Jemaima Tiatia-Siau
- Valerie Saena Tuia
- Riz Tupai-Firestone
- Selina Tusitala Marsh
- Teo Tuvale
- Emma Kruse Va'ai

== Entertainment ==
=== Actors ===
- Frankie Adams
- Cooper Andrews
- KJ Apa
- Jaclyn Betham
- Teuila Blakely
- Goretti Chadwick
- Eteuati Ete
- Aaron Fa'aoso
- David Fane
- Tofiga Fepulea'i
- Mario Gaoa
- Nephi Hannemann
- Al Harrington
- Dwayne Johnson
- Oscar Kightley
- Beulah Koale
- Jay Laga'aia
- Nathaniel Lees
- Daniel Logan
- Michael Logo
- Pua Magasiva
- Robbie Magasiva
- Rose Matafeo
- Joe Naufahu
- Rene Naufahu
- Anapela Polataivao
- Tanoai Reed
- Fa'afiaula Sagote
- Victoria Schmidt
- Peter Tuiasosopo
- Lani Tupu
- Jared Turner
- Sima Urale
- Taylor Wily
- Nuufolau Joel Seanoa

=== Bands ===
- 3 the Hard Way
- Adeaze
- Boo-Yaa T.R.I.B.E.
- Common Kings
- Deceptikonz
- Double J and Twice the T
- Fat Freddy's Drop
- Frontline
- Herbs
- Home Brew Crew
- HP Boyz
- Ilanda
- Kulcha
- Nesian Mystik
- No Money Enterprise
- Onefour
- Pacific Soul
- Sol3 Mio
- Te Vaka
- The Five Stars
- The Katinas
- The Keil Isles
- The Yandall Sisters

=== Dancers ===
- Parris Goebel
- Neil Ieremia
- Freddie Letuli
- Tony Meredith

=== Filmmakers ===
- Queen Muhammad Ali
- Aaron Fa'aoso
- John Kneubuhl
- Vela Manusaute
- Dan Taulapapa McMullin
- Victor Rodger
- Louis Sutherland
- Tusi Tamasese
- Lisa Taouma
- Makerita Urale
- Sima Urale

=== Groups ===
- Laughing Samoans
- Naked Samoans

=== News Media ===
- Autagavaia Tipi Autagavaia
- Daniel Faitaua
- April Ieremia
- Savea Sano Malifa
- Eti Saaga
- Pippa Wetzell

=== Singers/Musicians ===
- Raquel Abolins-Reid
- Nick Afoa
- Sam Ah Chookoon
- Alex Aiono
- Bobby Alu
- Kylie Auldist
- Tedashii Anderson
- Robina Brown
- Kingdon Chapple-Wilson
- John Matakite Chong-Nee
- Jackie Clarke
- Aivale Cole
- Daniel Rae Costello
- David Dallas
- Iosefa Enari
- Lipo Faaolii
- Beau Fa'asamala
- Kas Futialo
- Taimane Gardner
- Jordan Gavet
- Jade Goto
- Jerome Grey
- Dinah Jane Hansen
- Sam Hansen
- Vince Harder
- Maryanne Ito
- Alphonso Keil
- Eliza Keil
- Freddie Keil
- Herma Keil
- Olaf Keil
- Exodus Lale
- David Le'aupepe
- Jonathan Lemalu
- Moana Leota
- Youngn Lipz
- Robyn Loau
- Tenelle Luafalemana
- Malo Luafutu
- Tau Moe
- Madison Nonoa
- Aaradhna Patel
- Pene Pati
- Shakaiah Perez
- Mei-Alicia Rika
- Mavis Rivers
- Sanerivi Sagala
- Mark Sagapolutele
- Matthew Saunoa
- Demetrius Savelio
- Levi Sesega
- Simeona Silapa
- Karoline Tamati
- William Tongi
- Mariota Tiumalu Tuiasosopo
- Napoleon Andrew Tuiteleleapaga
- Pati Umaga
- Bill Urale
- Rosita Vai
- Cheryl Deserée Vaimoso
- Mema Wilda
- Emily Williams
- Joshua Williams
- Lavina Williams

== Fashion ==
- Latafale Auva'a
- Storm Keating
- Marion Malena
- Gabby Westbrook-Patrick

== Medicine ==
- Esther Tumama Cowley-Malcolm
- Fuimaono Karl Pulotu-Endemann
- Erna Takazawa
- Walter Vermeulen

== Military ==
- Tee Masaniai

== Politics ==
=== Activists ===
- Falema‘i Lesa
- Leilua Lino
- Lauaki Namulauulu Mamoe
- Mata'afa Faumuina Fiame Mulinu'u I
- Maluseu Doris Tulifau

=== Civil servants ===
- Sua Rimoni Ah Chong
- Tuala Falani Chan Tung
- Tauili'ili Uili Meredith
- Tu'u'u Ieti Taulealo
- Tamaseu Leni Warren

=== Elected officials ===
- Pulu Ae Ae Jr.
- Muagututagata Peter Ah Him
- Tofilau Eti Alesana
- Gatoloaifaana Amataga Alesana-Gidlow
- Arthur Anae
- Le Mamea Matatumua Ata
- Josephine Bartley
- Toi Aukuso Cain
- Peter Tali Coleman
- Barbara Edmonds
- Tufuga Efi
- Eni Faleomavaega
- Lualemaga Faoa
- Taito Phillip Field
- Alf Filipaina
- Mike Gabbard
- Tulsi Gabbard
- Gaioi Tufele Galeai
- Mark Gosche
- Mufi Hannemann
- Tuala Ainiu Iusitino
- Luagalau Levaula Kamu
- Va'ai Kolone
- Seui Laau
- Winnie Laban
- Tuiloma Pule Lameko
- Aifili Paulo Lauvao
- Niko Lee Hang
- Tuli Le’iato
- Tufele Liamatua
- Agnes Loheni
- Peseta Sam Lotu-Iiga
- Afoa Moega Lutu
- Fialupe Felila Fiaui Lutu
- Matatumua Maimoana
- Utu Abe Malae
- Edgar Malepeai
- Tuilaepa Aiono Sailele Malielegaoi
- Fiame Naomi Mata'afa
- Laulu Fetauimalemau Mata'afa
- Lemanu Peleti Mauga
- Lolo Matalasi Moliga
- Fiame Mata'afa Faumuina Mulinu'u II
- Safuneitu'uga Pa'aga Neri
- Tanu Nona
- Aveau Niko Palamo
- A'eau Peniamina
- Le Tagaloa Pita
- Galea'i Peni Poumele
- Pula Nikolao Pula
- Amata Coleman Radewagen
- Misa Telefoni Retzlaff
- Le Mamea Ropati
- To’alepaiali’i Toeolesulusulu Salesa III
- Larry Sanitoa
- Vui Florence Saulo
- Velega Savali
- Polataivao Fosi Schmidt
- Lefau Harry Schuster
- Carmel Sepuloni
- William Sio
- Tuiloma Neroni Slade
- Aiono Nonumalo Sofara
- Liufau Sonoma
- Lemauga Lydia Sosene
- Va'aletoa Sualauvi II
- Faoa Aitofele Sunia
- Tauese Sunia
- Fuimaono Naoia Tei
- Tuanaitau F. Tuia
- Tuitama Talalelei Tuitama
- Save Liuato Tuitele
- Tuika Tuika
- Togiola Tulafono
- Andria Tupola
- Asiata Sale'imoa Va'ai
- Paddy Walker

=== Jurists ===
- Brenda Heather-Latu
- Richard Lussick
- Ida Malosi
- Olive Nelson
- Patu Tiava'asu'e Falefatu Sapolu
- Tafaoimalo Leilani Tuala-Warren
- Tole’afoa Solomona To’ailoa
- Mata Tuatagaloa
- Bode Uale

=== Royalty ===
- Mata'afa Iosefo
- Malietoa Laupepa
- Tupua Tamasese Lealofi III
- Tupua Tamasese Mea'ole
- Malietoa Moli
- Malietoa Tanumafili I
- Malietoa Tanumafili II

== Religion ==
- Iliafi Esera
- Otto Vincent Haleck
- Samani Pulepule
- Pio Taofinu'u
- Taimalelagi Fagamalama Tuatagaloa-Leota

== Sports ==
=== American football ===
- Isaako Aaitui
- George Achica
- Al Afalava
- C.J. Ah You
- Harland Ah You
- Junior Ah You
- James Aiono
- Clifton Alapa
- Tyson Alualu
- Brad Anae
- Robert Anae
- Ricky Andrews
- Charlie Ane Jr.
- Charlie Ane III
- Bob Apisa
- Donovan Arp
- Devin Asiasi
- Isaac Asiata
- Johan Asiata
- Matt Asiata
- Junior Aumavae
- Malaesala Aumavae–Laulu
- Sal Aunese
- Kahlil Bell
- Kendrick Bourne
- Inoke Breckterfield
- Algie Brown
- Richard Brown
- DeForest Buckner
- Colby Cameron
- Jordan Cameron
- Su'a Cravens
- Scott Crichton
- Hershel Dennis
- Daniel Ekuale
- Asotui Eli
- Pita Elisara
- Christian Elliss
- Jonah Elliss
- Kaden Elliss
- Luther Elliss
- Noah Elliss
- Justin Ena
- A. J. Epenesa
- DeQuin Evans
- Daniel Faalele
- Fa'alili Fa'amoe
- Nuu Faaola
- Jonathan Fanene
- Ta'ase Faumui
- Wilson Faumuina
- Troy Fautanu
- Eletise Fiatoa
- Malcom Floyd
- Fou Fonoti
- Toniu Fonoti
- Taliese Fuaga
- Chris Fuamatu-Maʻafala
- Haskell Garrett
- Randall Goforth
- Deacon Hill
- Wayne Hunter
- Nico Iamaleava
- Mekeli Ieremia
- Nate Ilaoa
- Junior Ioane
- Joey Iosefa
- Sale Isaia
- Mike Iupati
- Senio Kelemete
- Pat Kesi
- Hau'oli Kikaha
- Glen Kozlowski
- Mike Kozlowski
- Jake Kuresa
- Sataoa Laumea
- Shawn Lauvao
- Dave Lefotu
- Kili Lefotu
- Eku Leota
- Marist Liufau
- Sefo Liufau
- Joe Lobendahn
- Al Lolotai
- Shalom Luani
- Frankie Luvu
- Palauni Ma Sun
- Malaefou MacKenzie
- Kaluka Maiava
- Jordan Mailata
- Damien Mama
- Frank Manumaleuga
- Brandon Manumaleuna
- Vince Manuwai
- Marte Mapu
- Marcus Mariota
- Jeremiah Masoli
- Hercules Mata'afa
- Fred Matua
- Rey Maualuga
- Josh Mauga
- Kana'i Mauga
- Eteva Mauga-Clements
- Reagan Maui'a
- Francis Mauigoa
- Itula Mili
- Roy Miller
- Trevor Misipeka
- Darius Muasau
- Edwin Mulitalo
- Louis Murphy
- Kai Nacua
- Puka Nacua
- Jim Nicholson
- Ken Niumatalolo
- Al Noga
- Niko Noga
- Shaun Nua
- Joe Onosai
- Lonnie Palelei
- Anton Palepoi
- Tenny Palepoi
- Joe Paopao
- David Parry
- Saul Patu
- Penei Pavihi
- Domata Peko
- Kyle Peko
- Tupe Peko
- Leonard Peters
- Brandon Pili
- Ropati Pitoitua
- Kennedy Polamalu
- Troy Polamalu
- Isaiah Pola-Mao
- Benning Potoa'e
- Jeremiah Poutasi
- Tavita Pritchard
- Dominick Puni
- Mike Purcell
- Leo Reed
- Gabe Reid
- Jason Rivers
- Olive Sagapolu
- Pio Sagapolutele
- Blaine Saipaia
- Joe Salave'a
- Dan Saleaumua
- Dru Samia
- Lauvale Sape
- Jesse Sapolu
- Don Sasa
- Brashton Satele
- Samson Satele
- Jonah Savaiinaea
- Manuia Savea
- Brian Schwenke
- Kona Schwenke
- Ian Seau
- Junior Seau
- Mike Sellers
- Isaac Seumalo
- Nephi Sewell
- Noah Sewell
- Penei Sewell
- Khalil Shakir
- Danny Shelton
- Junior Siavii
- Sealver Siliga
- Mana Silva
- JuJu Smith-Schuster
- Brian Soi
- Paul Soliai
- Vic So'oto
- Isaac Sopoaga
- Xavier Su'a-Filo
- Nicky Sualua
- Kingsley Suamataia
- Frank Summers
- Blessman Ta'ala
- Alameda Ta'amu
- Ed Taʻamu
- Jordan Ta'amu
- Nu'u Tafisi
- Taulia Tagovailoa
- Tua Tagovailoa
- Maa Tanuvasa
- Lofa Tatupu
- Mosi Tatupu
- Vai Taua
- Kurt Taufa'asau
- Junior Tautalatasi
- Terry Tautolo
- Sae Tautu
- Jahlani Tavai
- Jonah Tavai
- J.R. Tavai
- Justus Tavai
- Daniel Te'o-Nesheim
- Manti Te'o
- Martin Tevaseu
- Jack Thompson
- D.J. Tialavea
- John Timu
- Pisa Tinoisamoa
- Albert Toeaina
- Matt Toeaina
- Pago Togafau
- Levine Toilolo
- Henry To'oTo'o
- Mao Tosi
- Charles Tuaau
- Esera Tuaolo
- Natu Tuatagaloa
- Manu Tuiasosopo
- Marques Tuiasosopo
- JT Tuimoloau
- Lavasier Tuinei
- Mark Tuinei
- Van Tuinei
- Joe Tuipala
- Willie Tuitama
- Maugaula Tuitele
- DJ Uiagalelei
- Matayo Uiagalelei
- Mike Ulufale
- Morris Unutoa
- Tuufuli Uperesa
- Destiny Vaeao
- Jeremiah Valoaga
- Lenny Vandermade
- Devaughn Vele
- Larry Warford
- Jaylen Warren
- Albert Wilson

=== Archery ===
- Joseph Muaausa
- Maureen Tuimalealiifano

=== Australian Football ===
- Aaron Edwards
- Mykelti Lefau

=== Baseball ===
- Benny Agbayani
- Chris Aguila
- Brennan Bernardino
- Mike Fetters
- Jacob Hannemann
- Isiah Kiner-Falefa
- Wes Littleton
- Sean Manaea
- Blake Sabol
- Tony Solaita
- Matt Tuiasosopo

=== Basketball ===
- Zitina Aokuso
- Kylan Boswell
- Rashaun Broadus
- Isaac Davidson
- Penina Davidson
- Rob Dillingham
- Julius Halaifonua
- Leon Henry
- Shea Ili
- James Johnson
- Bubba Lau'ese
- Charlisse Leger-Walker
- Kristen Mann
- Naomi Mulitauaopele
- Daishen Nix
- Te-Hina Paopao
- Alissa Pili
- Dion Prewster
- Charmian Purcell
- Kalani Purcell
- Natalie Purcell
- Wally Rank
- Jerzy Robinson
- Peyton Siva
- Tolu Smith
- John Tofi
- Drake U'u
- Mekeli Wesley
- Yanni Wetzell
- Wendell White

=== Bobsled ===
- Faauuga Muagututia

=== Boxing ===
- Paulo Aokuso
- Monty Betham Jr
- Monty Betham Sr
- Richard Betham
- Herman Ene-Purcell
- Emerio Fainuulua
- Lio Falaniko
- Sililo Figota
- Polataivao Fosi
- Warren Fuavailili
- Bob Gasio
- Alex Leapai
- David Letele
- Togasilimai Letoa
- Patrick Mailata
- Maselino Masoe
- Mika Masoe
- Alrie Meleisea
- Birthony Nansen
- Jai Opetaia
- Joseph Parker
- Ato Plodzicki-Faoagali
- Tuna Scanlan
- Ray Sefo
- Vaitele Soi
- Jason Suttie
- Apollo Sweet
- Lawrence Tauasa
- Satupaitea Farani Tavui
- James Senio Peau
- David Tua
- Maselino Tuifao

=== Canoeing ===
- Rudolph Berking-Williams
- Anne Cairns
- Tuva'a Clifton

=== Cricket ===
- Ken Kinnersley
- Sebastian Kohlhase
- Ata Matatumua
- Rodney Reid
- Murphy Su'a
- Ross Taylor

=== Cycling ===
- Natasha Hansen
- Bianca Netzler

=== Golf ===
- Tony Finau
- Frank Molloy

=== Judo ===
- Silulu A'etonu
- Anthony Liu
- Aleni Smith
- Derek Sua
- Benjamin Waterhouse
- Travolta Waterhouse

=== Mixed Martial Arts ===
- Kailin Curran
- Genah Fabian
- Andre Fili
- Kendall Grove
- Max Holloway
- Mark Hunt
- Lolohea Mahe
- Raquel Pa'aluhi
- Tyson Pedro
- Eric Pele
- Siala-Mou Siliga
- Junior Tafa
- Justin Tafa
- Tai Tuivasa
- Falaniko Vitale
- Robert Whittaker

=== Netball ===
- Aliyah Dunn
- Sheryl Clarke-Scanlan
- Rita Fatialofa-Paloto
- Temepara George
- Paula Griffin
- April Ieremia
- Cathrine Latu
- Ariana Luamanu
- Bernice Mene
- Lenora Misa
- Julianna Naoupu
- Ann-Helen Rasmussen
- Grace Rasmussen
- Rachel Rasmussen
- Soli Ropati
- Frances Solia
- Lorna Suafoa
- Larafina Tanielu-Stowers
- Maria Tutaia
- Linda Vagana

=== Professional Wrestling ===
- Joseph Afamasaga
- Afa Anoaʻi
- Afa Anoaʻi Jr.
- Leati Joseph Anoa'i (Roman Reigns)
- Lloyd Anoaʻi
- Matthew Anoa'i
- Rodney Anoa'i
- Samula Anoa'i
- Sika Anoaʻi
- Cheree Crowley
- Emily Dole
- Ulualoaiga Emelio
- Savelina Fanene
- Edward Fatu (Umaga)
- Isayah Fatu
- Jacob Fatu
- Jonathan Fatu (Jimmy Uso)
- Joseph Fatu (Solo Sikoa)
- Joshua Fatu (Jey Uso)
- Sam Fatu
- Solofa Fatu (Rikishi)
- Jermaine Haley
- Dwayne Johnson
- Simone Johnson
- Danielle Kamela
- Bruce Leaupepe
- Neff Maiava
- Lia Maivia
- Peter Maivia
- Sean Maluta
- Nuufolau Seanoa
- Sonny Siaki
- James Snuka Jr.
- James Snuka Sr.
- Sarona Snuka
- Leilani Tominiko
- Daniel Vidot

=== Rugby ===
- Brad Abbey
- Failaga Afamasaga
- Jack Afamasaga
- Viliamu Afatia
- Vavao Afemai
- Bunty Afoa
- Fa'ausu Afoa
- John Afoa
- Ana-Maria Afuie
- Fred Ah Kuoi
- John Ah Kuoi
- Isaak Ah Mau
- Leeson Ah Mau
- Cruze Ah-Nau
- Patrick Ah Van
- Nigel Ah Wong
- Rodney Ah You
- Pita Ahki
- Andrew Aiolupo
- Bundee Aki
- Allan Alaalatoa
- Harlan Ala'alatoa
- Michael Alaalatoa
- Vili Alaalatoa
- Solomon Alaimalo
- Brian Alainu'uese
- AJ Alatimu
- Robbie Ale
- Paul Alo-Emile
- Alofa Alofa
- Josh Aloiai
- Tom Amone
- Afa Amosa
- Albert Anae
- Sosene Anesi
- Daejarn Asi
- Polo Asi
- John Asiata
- Nelson Asofa-Solomona
- Roy Asotasi
- Ben Atiga
- Uini Atonio
- Fotunuupule Auelua
- Asafo Aumua
- Fa'atoina Autagavaia
- Kirisome Auva'a
- Ole Avei
- Graeme Bachop
- Stephen Bachop
- Andreas Bauer
- Andrew Bentley
- Kane Bentley
- Peter Betham
- Mark Birtwistle
- Dean Blore
- Shawn Blore
- Andrew Blowers
- Brandon Boor
- Donald Brighouse
- Destiny Brill
- Dylan Brown
- Fa'amanu Brown
- Olo Brown
- Willie Brown
- Daniel Browne
- Jahream Bula
- Frank Bunce
- George Carmont
- Michael Chee-Kam
- Erin Clark
- Caleb Clarke
- Eroni Clarke
- John Clarke
- Jerry Collins
- Garrick Cowley
- Pele Cowley
- Christian Crichton
- Loki Crichton
- Stephen Crichton
- Christian Cullen
- Oscar Danielson
- Matt Duffie
- Elia Elia
- Mark Elia
- Alex Elisala
- Ere Enari
- Kane Epati
- Herman Ese'ese
- Tiffany Fa’ae’e
- Henry Fa'afili
- Sef Fa'agase
- David Fa'alogo
- Tupo Fa'amasino
- Fiao'o Fa'amausili
- Poasa Faamausili
- Jamason Faʻanana-Schultz
- Piula Faʻasalele
- Maurie Fa'asavalu
- So'otala Fa'aso'o
- Tino Fa'asuamaleaui
- Lome Fa'atau
- Leo Faaeteete
- George Fai
- Sonny Fai
- TJ Faiane
- Kalifa Faifai Loa
- Jetaya Faifua
- Esene Faimalo
- Raymond Faitala-Mariner
- David Faiumu
- Kepi Faiva'ai
- Max Fala
- Fa'afoi Falaniko
- Terry Fanolua
- Ron Fanuatanu
- Alafoti Fa'osiliva
- Bureta Faraimo
- David Fatialofa
- Peter Fatialofa
- Charlie Faumuina
- Sione Faumuina
- Max Feagai
- Chris Feauai-Sautia
- Dominic Fe'aunati
- Maddie Feaunati
- Isaac Fe'aunati
- JJ Felise
- Maika Felise
- Daniel Fepuleai
- Vincent Fepulea'i
- Hamiso Tabuai-Fidow
- Fa'atonu Fili
- Karl Filiga
- Olsen Filipaina
- Marvin Filipo
- Ross Filipo
- Nic Fitisemanu
- Theresa Fitzpatrick
- Greg Foe
- Sione Fonua
- DJ Forbes
- Kahn Fotuali'i
- Robbie Fruean
- Mike Fuailefau
- Steve Fualau
- Tani Fuga
- Taliah Fuimaono
- Tyrell Fuimaono
- Eliota Fuimaono-Sapolu
- Beau Gallagher
- Joe Galuvao
- Connor Garden-Bachop
- Jackson Garden-Bachop
- James Gavet
- Simon Geros
- Craig Glendinning
- Pita Godinet
- Payne Haas
- Harrison Hansen
- George Harder
- Jamie Helleur
- Carl Hoeft
- Phoenix Hunapo-Nofoa
- Hymel Hunt
- Karmichael Hunt
- Royce Hunt
- Jordan Hyland
- Alama Ieremia
- Len Ikitau
- Stacey Ili
- Krisnan Inu
- Akira Ioane
- Digby Ioane
- Eddie Ioane
- Josh Ioane
- Mark Ioane
- Monty Ioane
- Rieko Ioane
- TJ Ioane
- Rodney Iona
- Iopu Iopu-Aso
- Masada Iosefa
- Willie Isa
- Jamayne Isaako
- Malaki Iupeli
- Census Johnston
- James Johnston
- Michael Jones
- Cameron Jowitt
- Jerome Kaino
- Shiray Kaka
- Danny Kaleopa
- Sam Kaleta
- Simone Karpani
- Sam Kasiano
- Oregon Kaufusi
- Mat Keenan
- Darren Kellett
- Richard Kennar
- Ivana Kiripati
- Lolani Koko
- Vae Kololo
- Tony Koonwaiyou
- Josh Kronfeld
- Timothy Lafaele
- Tim Lafai
- Leo Lafaiali'i
- Shane Laloata
- Junior Laloifi
- Lalomilo Lalomilo
- Ben Lam
- Jack Lam
- Pat Lam
- George Latu
- Ali Lauiti'iti
- Casey Laulala
- Luteru Laulala
- Nepo Laulala
- Brian Laumatia
- Quentin Laulu-Togaga'e
- Tasesa Lavea
- Jordan Lay
- Silao Leaega
- Charlie Leaeno
- Mark Leafa
- Patrick Leafa
- Kas Lealamanua
- Christian Lealiifano
- Brian Leauma
- George Leaupepe
- Alaisalatemaota Leavasa
- Potu Leavasa
- Fritz Lee
- Tala Leiasamaivao
- Joseph Leilua
- Luciano Leilua
- Neueli Leitufia
- Alapati Leiua
- Na'ama Leleimalefaga
- Fa'atiga Lemalu
- Simon Lemalu
- Saini Lemamea
- David Lemi
- Spencer Leniu
- Daniel Leo
- Johnny Leota
- Moses Leota
- Trevor Leota
- Jeff Lepa
- Tuaalagi Lepupa
- Kylie Leuluai
- Phillip Leuluai
- Thomas Leuluai
- Vincent Leuluai
- Tamato Leupolu
- Ricky Leutele
- Tausani Levale
- Faifili Levave
- Danny Levi
- Filipo Levi
- Anton Lienert-Brown
- Daniel Lienert-Brown
- Palemia Lilomaiava
- BJ Telefoni Lima
- Brian Lima
- Danny Lima
- Jeff Lima
- Peter Lima
- Mason Lino
- Lamar Liolevave
- Sam Lisone
- Isaac Liu
- Sienna Lofipo
- Jamahl Lolesi
- Keith Lowen
- Jarome Luai
- Ekeroma Luaiufi
- Joel Luani
- Steve Luatua
- Dunamis Lui
- Lolo Lui
- Des Maea
- Patrick Mago
- Uale Mai
- Hutch Maiava
- Tom Maiava
- Sean Maitland
- Reni Maitua
- Jeff Makapelu
- Gus Malietoa-Brown
- Va'a Apelu Maliko
- Clifford Manua
- Penani Manumalealii
- Seilala Mapusua
- Lelia Masaga
- Sarina Masaga
- Chris Masoe
- Mose Masoe
- Willie Mason
- Suaia Matagi
- Steve Matai
- Onehunga Matauiau
- Chanel Mata'utia
- Pat Mata'utia
- Peter Mata'utia
- Sione Mata'utia
- Vila Matautia
- Ben Matulino
- Aaron Mauger
- Nathan Mauger
- Ken Maumalo
- Taylan May
- Terrell May
- Tyrone May
- Deine Mariner
- Wayne McDade
- Josh McGuire
- Emmanuel Meafou
- Jerry Meafou
- Kelly Meafua
- Keven Mealamu
- Francis Meli
- Jonathan Meredith
- Steve Meredith
- Liam Messam
- Dom Michael
- Brad Mika
- Constantine Mika
- Dylan Mika
- Michael Mika
- Simaika Mikaele
- Anthony Milford
- Laloa Milford
- Bella Milo
- Destiny Mino-Sinapati
- Tautau Moga
- Peewee Moke
- Izaiha Moore-Aiono
- Junior Moors
- Alamanda Motuga
- Richard Mo'unga
- Mils Muliaina
- Logovi'i Mulipola
- Lucky Mulipola
- Ronaldo Mulitalo
- Zane Musgrove
- Heka Nanai
- Jeremiah Nanai
- Melani Nanai
- Tim Nanai-Williams
- George Naoupu
- Sene Naoupu
- Ben Nee-Nee
- Elijah Niko
- Taunu'u Niulevaea
- David Nofoaluma
- Ma'a Nonu
- Tu Nu'uali'itia
- Annetta Nu'uausala
- Frank-Paul Nu'uausala
- John Nuumaalii
- Ray Ofisa
- Hitro Okesene
- Paul Okesene
- Steve Onosai
- Motu Opetai
- Duncan Paia'aua
- Fosi Pala'amo
- Thretton Palamo
- Keenan Palasia
- Iafeta Paleaaesina
- Opeta Palepoi
- Sam Panapa
- Abraham Papalii
- Isaiah Papali'i
- Josh Papalii
- Tavarna Papalii
- Junior Paramore
- Luron Patea
- Liz Patu
- Christine Pauli
- Pauli Pauli
- Maselino Paulino
- Filo Paulo
- Joseph Paulo
- Junior Paulo (born 1983)
- Junior Paulo (born 1993)
- Ti’i Paulo
- Junior Pelesasa
- Daniel Penese
- Apollo Perelini
- Anthony Perenise
- Paul Perez
- Stephen Perofeta
- Sam Perrett
- Mikaele Pesamino
- Fred Petersen
- Eddy Pettybourne
- Dominique Peyroux
- Pauline Piliae-Rasabale
- George Pisi
- Ken Pisi
- Tusi Pisi
- Robert Piva
- Mataupu Poching
- Willie Poching
- Junior Poluleuligaga
- Peter Poulos
- Frank Pritchard
- Kaysa Pritchard
- Esera Puleitu
- Frank Puletua
- Tony Puletua
- Augustine Pulu
- Edward Purcell
- Justin Purdie
- Dale Rasmussen
- Brendan Reidy
- Nathaniel Roache
- Ben Roberts
- Bernadette Robertson
- Iva Ropati
- Jerome Ropati
- Joe Ropati
- Peter Ropati
- Romi Ropati
- Tangi Ropati
- Tea Ropati
- Setaimata Sa
- Fereti Sa'aga
- Filipo Saena
- Daniel Saifiti
- Jacob Saifiti
- Francis Saili
- Peter Saili
- Solomona Sakalia
- Muliufi Salanoa
- Manaia Salavea
- Toa Samania
- Luke Samoa
- Smith Samau
- Phillip Sami
- Luke Samoa
- Ligi Sao
- Junior Sa'u
- Sami Sauiluma
- Ardie Savea
- Julian Savea
- Andre Savelio
- Paulo Scanlan
- John Schuster
- Peter Schuster
- John Schwalger
- Mahonri Schwalger
- Alex Sedrick
- Silao Vaisola Sefo
- Patrick Segi
- Aki Seiuli
- Jesse Sene-Lefao
- John Senio
- Kevin Senio
- Mike Setefano
- Lagi Setu
- Terence Seu Seu
- Taleni Seu
- Ava Seumanufagai
- Tasia Seumanufagai
- Shoshanah Seumanutafa
- Jerry Seuseu
- Elvis Seveali'i
- Regina Sheck
- Siliva Siliva
- Tim Simona
- Irae Simone
- Fata Sini
- Sinoti Sinoti
- David Sio
- Ken Sio
- Keneti Sio
- Michael Sio
- Scott Sio
- Toafofoa Sipley
- Semo Sititi
- Cameron Skelton
- Will Skelton
- Chad Slade
- Jeremy Smith
- Iosia Soliola
- Dave Solomon
- Frank Solomon
- David Solomona
- Denny Solomona
- Malo Solomona
- Se'e Solomona
- Afato So'oalo
- James So'oialo
- Rodney So'oialo
- Steven So'oialo
- Lima Sopoaga
- Tupou Sopoaga
- Mike Sosene-Feagai
- Charlie Staines
- Benson Stanley
- Chase Stanley
- Jeremy Stanley
- Joe Stanley
- Kyle Stanley
- Michael Stanley
- Sam Stanley
- Miguel Start
- George Stowers
- Shannon Stowers
- Jaydn Su'A
- Jeremy Su'a
- Vaovasa Afa Su'a
- Joseph Suaalii
- Sauaso Sue
- Andrew Suniula
- Roland Suniula
- Shalom Suniula
- Anthony Swann
- Logan Swann
- Willie Swann
- Conrad Ta'akimoeaka
- Cynthia Ta'ala
- Sene Ta'ala
- Niva Ta'auso
- Angus Ta'avao
- Henry Taefu
- Pelu Taele
- Timo Tagaloa
- Sam Tagataese
- Sailosi Tagicakibau
- Izack Tago
- Monica Tagoai
- Pingi Tala'apitaga
- Willie Talau
- Albert Talipeau
- Robert Tanielu
- Ben Tapuai
- Lama Tasi
- Tautalatasi Tasi
- Josh Tatupu
- Tony Tatupu
- Joe Taufeteʻe
- Jordan Taufua
- Jorge Taufua
- Mark Taufua
- Jamie-Jerry Taulagi
- Murray Taulagi
- Misi Taulapapa
- Martin Taupau
- Taulima Tautai
- Ezra Taylor
- Joe Tekori
- Mark Tele'a
- Ben Te'o
- Jazz Tevaga
- Kane Thompson
- Junior Tia-Kilifi
- Neemia Tialata
- Chase Tiatia
- Filo Tiatia
- Matt Timoko
- Caleb Timu
- Filipo Toala
- Isaia Toeava
- Sarah Togatuki
- Kalolo Toleafoa
- Senio Toleafoa
- Onosai Tololima-Auva'a
- Joe Tomane
- Sio Tomkinson
- Jeremy Tomuli
- Lama Tone
- Willie Tonga
- Young Tonumaipea
- Ofisa Tonu'u
- Motu Tony
- Brian To'o
- Renouf To'omaga
- Jeffery Toomaga-Allen
- Stan To'omalatai
- Matt To'omua
- Ofisa Treviranus
- Ahsee Tuala
- Enari Tuala
- Belgium Tuatagaloa
- Lukhan Tui
- Ruby Tui
- Mose Tuiali'i
- Des Tuiavi'i
- Isaia Tuifua
- Taiasina Tuifu'a
- Sonny Tuigamala
- Va'aiga Tuigamala
- Alesana Tuilagi
- Anitelea Tuilagi
- Fred Tuilagi
- Freddie Tuilagi
- Henry Tuilagi
- Manu Tuilagi
- Sanele Vavae Tuilagi
- Kalolo Tuiloma
- Tietie Tuimauga
- Carlos Tuimavave
- Evarn Tuimavave
- Paddy Tuimavave
- Tony Tuimavave
- Patrick Tuipulotu
- Roger Tuivasa-Sheck
- Alatasi Tupou
- Jimmy Tupou
- Alisi Tupuailei
- Richard Turner
- Denning Tyrell
- Braden Uele
- Tauvere Ugapo
- Ulia Ulia
- Wayne Ulugia
- Jack Umaga
- Jacob Umaga
- Mike Umaga
- Tana Umaga
- Thomas Umaga-Jensen
- Matt Utai
- Stefano Utoikamanu
- Earl Va'a
- Justin Va'a
- Brando Va'aulu
- Mathew Vaea
- Chris Vaefaga
- Matt Vaega
- To’o Vaega
- Alfie Vaeluaga
- Joe Vagana
- Nigel Vagana
- Siaosi Vaili
- Alefaio Vaisuai
- Paterika Vaivai
- Taioalo Vaivai
- Gray Viane
- Daniel Vidot
- Tanner Vili
- Kitiona Viliamu
- Va'apu'u Vitale
- Lolagi Visinia
- Victor Vito
- Michael von Dincklage
- Ruben Wiki
- Bryan Williams
- Darrell Williams
- Daryl Williams
- Dennis A. Williams
- Gavin Williams
- Niall Williams
- Nick Williams
- Paul Williams
- Sonny Bill Williams
- Tim Winitana
- Antonio Winterstein
- Frank Winterstein
- Psalm Wooching
- Matthew Wright
- Rudi Wulf
- Vincent Wulf

=== Sailing ===
- Eroni Leilua
- Vaimooia Ripley
- Fua Logo Tavui

=== Soccer ===
- Sarai Bareman
- Michael Boxall
- Nikko Boxall
- Chris Cahill
- Tim Cahill
- Paul Collins
- Chardonnay Curran
- Jared Curtis
- Shaun Easthope
- Desmond Fa'aiuaso
- Vaalii Faalogo
- Tama Fasavalu
- Sandra Fruean
- Seth Galloway
- Jordan Grantz
- Motu Hafoka
- Johnny Hall
- Faitalia Hamilton-Pama
- Cameron Howieson
- Benson Hunt
- Dane Ingham
- Jai Ingham
- Bevan Kapisi
- Keone Kapisi
- Vito Laloata
- Iofi Lalogafuafua
- Renee Leota
- Tunoa Lui
- Torijan Lyne-Lewis
- Samuelu Malo
- Silao Malo
- Ryan Martin
- Faalavelave Matagi
- Junior Michael
- Andrew Mobberley
- Mariah Nogueira-Bullock
- Jasmine Pereira
- Jaiyah Saelua
- Nicky Salapu
- Mike Saofaiga
- Paulo Scanlan
- Pasi Schwalger
- Andrew Setefano
- Jason Si'i
- Lionel Taylor
- Lapalapa Toni
- Bill Tuiloma

=== Softball ===
- Jocelyn Alo
- Megan Faraimo
- Megan Grant
- Tiare Jennings
- Chris Kohlhase
- Eddie Kohlhase
- Ruta Lealamanua
- Dejah Mulipola
- Keilani Ricketts
- Samantha Ricketts

=== Sumo Wrestling ===
- Saleva'a Fuauli Atisano'e
- Fiamalu Penitani
- Kilifi Sapa
- Taylor Wily

=== Swimming and Diving ===
- Evelina Afoa
- Daniel Bell
- Olivia Borg
- Gabrielle Fa'amausili
- Orinoco Faamausili-Banse
- Virginia Farmer
- Lelei Fonoimoana
- Megan Fonteno
- Kokoro Frost
- Stewart Glenister
- Emma Hunter
- Robin Leamy
- Greg Louganis
- Micah Masei
- Ching Maou Wei
- Monica Saili
- Tilali Scanlan
- Brandon Schuster
- Lushavel Stickland
- Alania Suttie

=== Taekwondo ===
- Talitiga Crawley
- Kaino Thomsen

=== Tennis ===
- Destanee Aiava
- Steffi Carruthers
- Annerly Poulos
- Claudine Toleafoa

=== Track and Field ===
- Serafina Akeli
- Kolone Alefosio
- Sarah Cowley
- Aunese Curreen
- Jeremy Dodson
- Elama Fa’atonu
- William Fong
- Emanuele Fuamatu
- Filomenaleonisa Iakopo
- Faresa Kapisi
- Alefosio Laki
- Anthony Leiato
- Jordan Mageo
- Lisa Misipeka
- Trevor Misipeka
- Kelsey Nakanelua
- Alex Rose
- Savannah Sanitoa
- Shanahan Sanitoa
- Margaret Satupai
- Isaac Silafau
- Henry Smith
- Shaka Sola
- Chris Sua'mene
- Iloai Suaniu
- Nathaniel Sulupo
- Laulauga Tausaga
- Nuuausala Tuilefano
- Dolores Tuimoloau
- Sogelau Tuvalu
- Kasandra Vegas
- Maddi Wesche
- Jireh Westerlund

=== Volleyball ===
- Eric Fonoimoana
- Falyn Fonoimoana
- Tolotear Lealamanua
- Nehemiah Mote
- Garrett Muagututia
- Joshua Tuaniga
- Leslie Tuiasosopo

=== Water Polo ===
- Tumua Anae
- Sami Hill
- Joe Kayes

=== Weightlifting ===
- Eric Brown
- Lopesi Faagu
- Faavae Faauliuli
- Lesila Fiapule
- Vaipava Ioane
- Tanumafili Jungblut
- Eleei Lalio
- Siaosi Leuo
- Maeu Nanai Livi
- Lauititi Lui
- Sanele Mao
- Uati Maposua
- Ofisa Ofisa
- Don Opeloge
- Ele Opeloge
- Jack Opeloge
- Mary Opeloge
- Niusila Opeloge
- Petunu Opeloge
- Tovia Opeloge
- Toafitu Perive
- Ajah Pritchard-Lolo
- Alesana Sione
- Iuniarra Sipaia
- Feagaiga Stowers
- John Tafi
- Tauama Timoti

=== Wrestling ===
- Louis Purcell
- Nathaniel Tuamoheloa
