= Lutu =

Lutu may refer to:

- Lutu T. S. Fuimaono (1930–2004), American Samoa politician and journalist
- Afoa Moega Lutu (1947–2023), American Samoan politician and attorney
- Fialupe Felila Fiaui Lutu, American Samoan civil servant and politician
- Ion Ionuț Luțu (born 1975), Romanian former professional footballer

== See also ==
- Lupu (surname)
- Lute (disambiguation)
- Lutz (disambiguation)
