= Kinnersley (disambiguation) =

Kinnersley is a village in Herefordshire, England.

Kinnersley may also refer to:

- Kinnersley, Worcestershire, a location in Severn Stoke parish, Worcestershire, England
- Kinnersley (surname)
- Kinnersley Castle, Herefordshire, England
  - Kennersley Castle (1811 ship), wrecked in 1833
- Kynnersley, Shropshire, England, sometimes historically spelled as Kinnersley
- Kinnersley Manor, Horley, Surrey, England
