= Tuia =

Tuia is a surname. Notable people with the surname include:

- Alessandro Tuia (born 1990), Italian footballer
- Pio Tuia (born 1943), Tokelauan politician
- Samuel Tuia (born 1986), French volleyball player
- Tuanaitau F. Tuia (c.1920 – 2010), American Samoan politician
- Valerie Saena Tuia, plant scientist from Samoa
