= Schwalger =

Schwalger is a surname. Notable people with the surname include:

- John Schwalger (born 1983), New Zealand rugby union player, nephew of Mahonri Schwalger
- Mahonri Schwalger (born 1978), Samoan rugby union player
- Oneata Schwalger (born 1985), Australian rugby union and rugby league footballer, sister of John Schwalger, and niece of Mahonri Schwalger
- Pasi Schwalger (born 1982), Samoan Australian former football and Australian rules football player
