= Willie Brown (rugby league) =

Australian rugby league footballer

Personal information
- Born: 21 January 1979 (age 47) Geelong, Victoria, Australia

Playing information
- Position: Centre, Second-row, Lock
Club
Years	Team	Pld	T	G	FG	P
2007	Sydney Roosters	2	0	0	0	0
- Source: As of 14 January 2012

Willie Brown is an Australian former professional rugby league footballer who played in the 2000s, he played 2 matches for the Sydney Roosters in the 2007 National Rugby League season. He made his NRL debut in Round-4 2007 in the 16-32 loss to the Brisbane Broncos at SFS. He is of Samoan descent, and he previously served a 2-year Mormon missionary in the Philippines.
