= Lutz (disambiguation) =

Lutz is a surname and given name.

Lutz may also refer to:

== Places ==
- Lütz, a municipality in Rhineland-Palatinate, Germany
- Lutz, Florida, an unincorporated census-designated place in the United States
- Lutz Hill, a hill in the Kyle Hills, Ross Island, Antarctica

== Other uses ==
- Lutz jump, a figure skating jump
- Lutz Children's Museum, a museum in Manchester, Connecticut, founded 1953
- Lutz, a fictional place in the 2014 film The Grand Budapest Hotel

== See also ==
- Baggersee Lutz, a lake in Baden-Württemberg, Germany
