= Tu'u'u Ieti Taulealo =

Samoan engineer

Tu'u'u Ieti Taule'alo is a Samoan public servant. From 2012 to 2018, he was Chairman of the Public Service Commission of Samoa.

Tu'u'u was President of the Western Samoa Public Services Association (WSPSA) during the 1981 PSA General Strike that contributed to the fall of the government of Taisi Tufuga Tupuola Efi in the following elections.

He obtained a bachelor's degree in engineering at the University of Canterbury (1971) in Christchurch, New Zealand, before completing his master's degree and PhD at the University of Sydney (in 1990 and 1997 respectively), in civil engineering.

He has been the director of Samoa's Lands, Survey and Environment Department. From January 2006 until September 2009, he was the chief executive officer of the Ministry of Environment in Samoa. He is also the chairman of the Board of Matuaileoo Environmental Trust, Inc. In 2012, he was appointed Chair of the Public Service Commission, and he was reappointed in 2015. He was not reappointed when his contract ended in 2018.

In 2023 he chaired a public inquiry into Samoa's electoral laws and processes.

Tu'u'u is married to Pasifika artist Vanya Taule'alo.
