= Sala Vaimili Uili II =

Samoan politician

Minister of Health
- In office 1991–1996
- Prime Minister: Tofilau Eti Alesana
- Succeeded by: Misa Telefoni Retzlaff

Member of the Samoa Parliament for Gaga'emauga No. 1
- In office 5 April 1991 – 26 April 1996
- Preceded by: Auali'itia Pinati
- Succeeded by: Tuala Falenaoti Tiresa

Personal details
- Party: Human Rights Protection Party; Tautua Samoa Party; F.A.S.T.

Sala Vaimili Uili II is a Samoan politician and former Cabinet Minister.

Vaimili was first elected to the Legislative Assembly of Samoa in the 1991 Western Samoan general election. He served as Minister of Health from 1991 to 1996. He lost his seat at the 1996 election. He unsuccessfully ran for election again in 2001 and 2006. He ran as a candidate for the Tautua Samoa Party at the 2011 election.

In May 2016 he was banished from the village of Leauva’a alongside two election candidates after supporting an election petition against incumbent MP Sala Fata Pinati.

He contested the 2021 election as a candidate for the F.A.S.T. Party, but was not elected. In August 2022 he was appointed to the board of the Samoa Ports Authority.
