= Cheryl Deserée =

Samoan American singer-songwriter (b. 1982)

- Born: Cheryl Deserée Vaimoso; March 4, 1982 (age 44); Long Beach, California
- Genres: Country, Polynesian, Western swing
- Occupation: Singer-songwriter
- Instruments: Guitar, ukulele
- Years active: 2014–present
- Label: Stepford Bunny Records

Cheryl Deserée Vaimoso (born March 4, 1982) is an American singer-songwriter based in Nashville, Tennessee. She is the first known singer of Samoan heritage to release a western swing album.

== Early life ==
Deserée is of Samoan, English, and Irish descent. She was raised in Hemet, California and San Jacinto, California, where she attended San Jacinto High School.

== Career ==
Deserée released her self-titled debut album Cheryl Deserée on February 9, 2016. The album includes all original material. On December 1, 2017, she released a Christmas single entitled Warm in December. Deserée's second album Dreamy was released on September 7, 2018.

== Discography ==
=== Albums ===
- Cheryl Deserée (2016)
- Dreamy (2018)

=== Singles ===
- Warm in December (2017)
