= Samoan Australians =

Australians of Samoan descent

Tagata Sāmoa i Ausetalia (Samoan)

Total population
- 98,029 (2021)

Regions with significant populations
- Sydney, Brisbane, Melbourne

Languages
- Australian English, Samoan

Religion
- Christianity, Polytheism, Irreligion

Related ethnic groups
- Other Polynesians

Samoan Australians refers to Australian citizens or residents who are of ethnic Samoan descent or people born in Samoa but grew up in Australia. However, there are many New Zealand-born Samoans living in Australia, known as Samoan New Zealand Australians. Most Samoans in Australia live in Sydney, Brisbane and Melbourne. Most people of Samoan heritage speak Samoan as their first language.

== History ==
After Christian missionaries from Australia began visiting Samoa in 1857, Samoan ministers began traveling to Australia for more training and to find work. However, Samoan and other non-European immigration to Australia was halted due to the White Australia policy in 1901. The next significant wave of Samoans to move to Australia was in the 1970s, where Samoans participated in educational programs sponsored by the Australian Government.

== Demographics ==
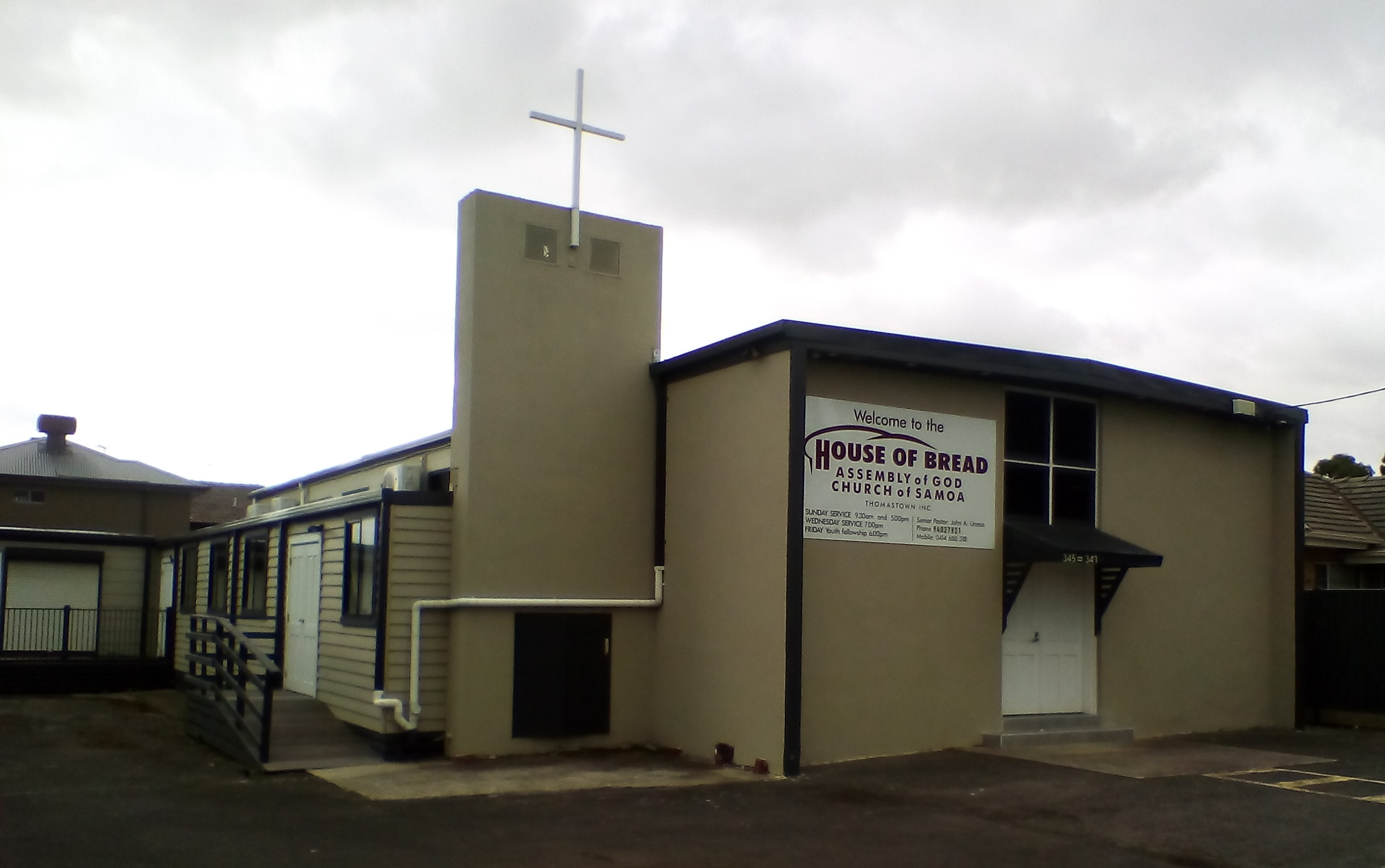
Samoan church in Thomastown, Melbourne

According to the 2006 Australian census, 15,244 Australians were born in Samoa and 193 in American Samoa while 39,992 claimed Samoan ancestry, either alone or with another ancestry. The 2011 Australian census showed an increase in both categories as Australians who claimed Samoan ancestry was 55,843 and Samoa-born residents were 19,092. According to the 2016 Australian census, there are a total of 75,755 Australians with Samoan ancestry. This number includes the 24,017 Australian residents who were born in the Samoan Islands. 41.3 percent of Samoan Australians live in New South Wales, 33.9 percent live in Queensland, 21.1 percent live in Victoria, and just 1.9 percent live in Western Australia. Samoan Australians are the second largest Polynesian group behind Māori Australians. In 2016, 49.3% of people claiming Samoan ancestry in New South Wales spoke Samoan at home and 47.0% spoke English at home.

== Notable people ==
- List of Samoans

== See also ==
- Samoan New Zealanders
- Samoan Americans
