= Kinnersley (surname) =

Kinnersley is a surname. Notable people with the surname include:

- Ebenezer Kinnersley (1711–1778), American scientist
- Ken Kinnersley (1914–1984), English cricketer
- William Morris Kinnersley, American physicist

== See also ==
- Thomas Kynnersley (1839–1874), British politician
