= Tuala Ainiu Iusitino =

Samoan politician

Minister of Women's Affairs
- In office 20 March 2001 – 24 April 2006
- Prime Minister: Tuila'epa Sa'ilele Malielegaoi
- Succeeded by: Fiame Naomi Mataʻafa

Minister of Broadcasting
- In office 20 March 2001 – 24 April 2006

Member of the Samoa Parliament for Gaga'emauga No. 1
- In office 2 March 2001 – 31 March 2006
- Preceded by: Tuala Falenaoti Tiresa
- Succeeded by: Sala Fata Pinati

Personal details
- Party: Human Rights Protection Party

Tuala Ainiu Iusitino (1936 – 31 August 2010) was a Samoan politician and former Cabinet Minister. He represented the constituency of Gaga'emauga No. 1.

Following the 2001 election he was appointed Minister of Women's Affairs. He also served as Minister of Broadcasting.

He lost his seat in the 2006 election.
