= Leo Faaeteete =

- Born: Leo Faaeteete; 10 May 1987 (age 39) Samoa
- Height: 5 ft 10 in (1.78 m)
- Weight: 13 st 7 lb (86 kg)

Rugby union career
- Position: Fullback
Senior career
Years	Team	Apps	(Points)
2008–	Steaua București Rugby	11	(25)

Leo Faaeteete (born 10 May 1987) is a Samoa rugby union footballer. A fullback, he is currently playing for Steaua București Rugby in the Romanian Rugby Championship.
