= Baggersee Lutz =

Lake in Krauchenwies, Baden-Württemberg, Germany

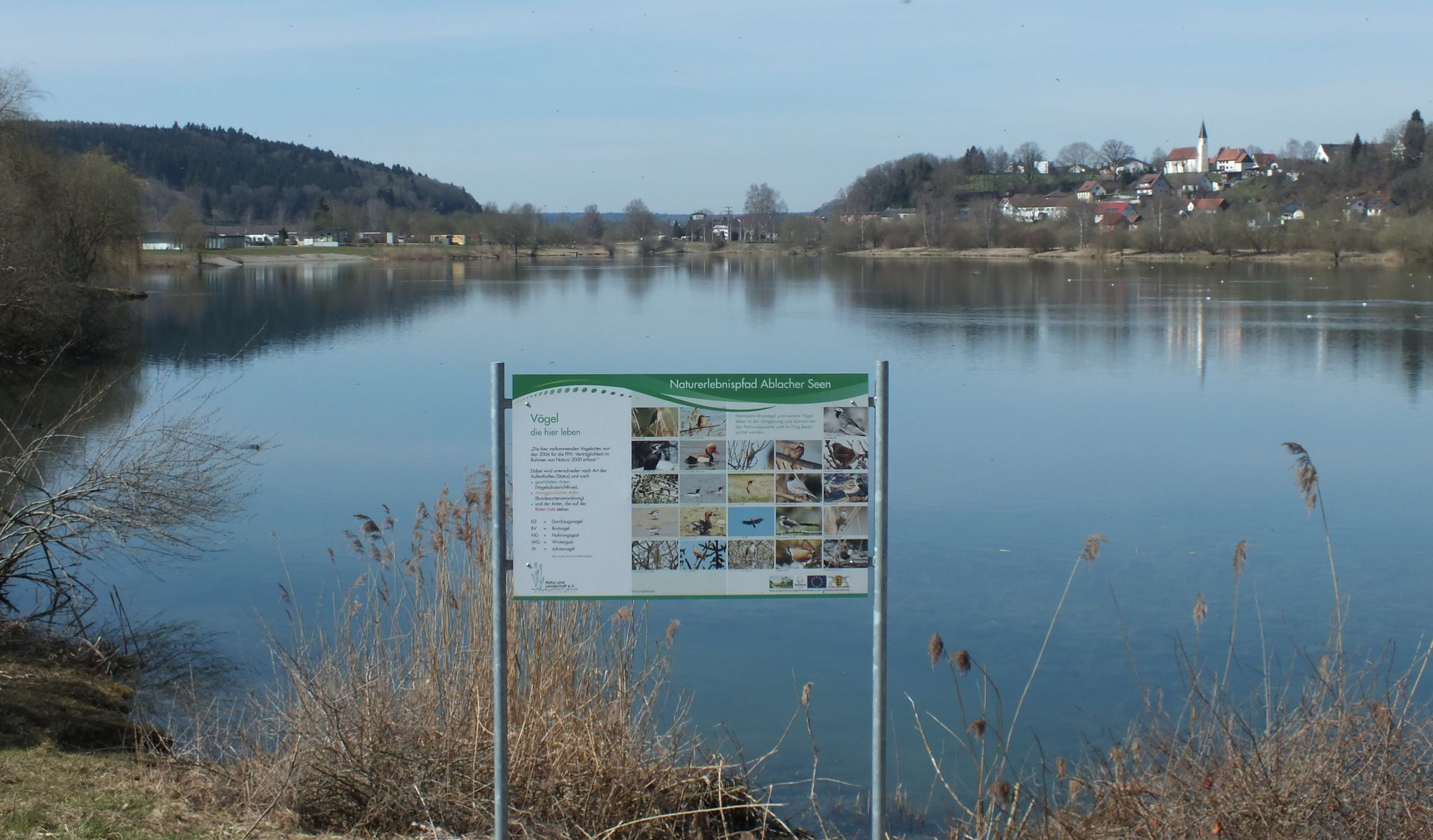
- View to Ablach and campsite "Seen Camping"

- Location within Baden-Württemberg
- Location: Baden-Württemberg
- Coordinates: 48°1′15″N 9°14′12″E
- Basin countries: Germany
- Max. length: 750 m (2,460 ft)
- Max. width: 300 m (980 ft)
- Shore length^{1}: 2,250 km (1,400 mi)
- Surface elevation: 580 m (1,900 ft)
- ^{1} Shore length is not a well-defined measure.

Baggersee Lutz is a lake in Krauchenwies, Baden-Württemberg, Germany. It has an elevation of 580 m.
