= Tuala Falenaoti Tiresa Malietoa =

Samoan politician and educator

Member of the Samoa Parliament for Gaga'emauga No. 1
- In office 26 April 1996 – 2 March 2001
- Preceded by: Sala Vaimili Uili II
- Succeeded by: Tuala Ainiu Iusitino

Personal details
- Born: 8 February 1924
- Died: 7 May 2016 (aged 92)
- Party: Samoan National Development Party

Tuala Falenaoti Teresa Minnah Hunter-Malietoa (also known as Tiresa Malietoa) (8 February 1924 - 7 May 2016) was a Samoan educator and politician. She was the wife of Samoa's Head of State Malietoa Tanumafili II. She was one of the first Samoan women to qualify as a teacher, and served as principal of the Samoa Teachers Training College and of the Samoa Public Service Association, was a member of parliament, and was one of the first women to lead a Samoan political party.

Tuala's father was a land surveyor in the New Zealand colonial administration. She grew up in Vaiala and was educated at Leifi’ifi school, and later in Tauranga in New Zealand. She was awarded a government scholarship to train at Ardmore Teachers' Training College, and worked at Petone Central School as a probationary assistant. When she graduated in 1953 alongside Laʻulu Fetauimalemau Mataʻafa they became the first Samoan women to qualify as a teacher.

She later studied at Victoria University of Wellington, graduating with a Bachelor of Arts, before becoming a lecturer at Apia Teachers Training College. In 1959 she attended the South Pacific Conference in Fiji, where she chaired the social development committee. She later served as president of the Samoa Public Service Association. In 1960 she represtened the Western Samoa Public Service Association at a conference of the New Zealand Public Service Association in Wellington.

She married Malietoa Tanumafili II in 1962.

She worked as director of continuing education at the University of the South Pacific for three and a half years, and was later director of its South Pacific Center. She also composed the university's song, "Garland of Achievement".

She was elected to the Samoan parliament as a candidate for the Samoan National Development Party in the 1996 Western Samoan general election. She lost her seat in the 2001 election. During the 2006 Samoan general election she led the Samoan Christian Party, becoming one of the first women to lead a Samoan political party. However, she failed to win a seat.
