= Samoans =

Indigenous Polynesian people of Samoa

Samoans tagata Sāmoa
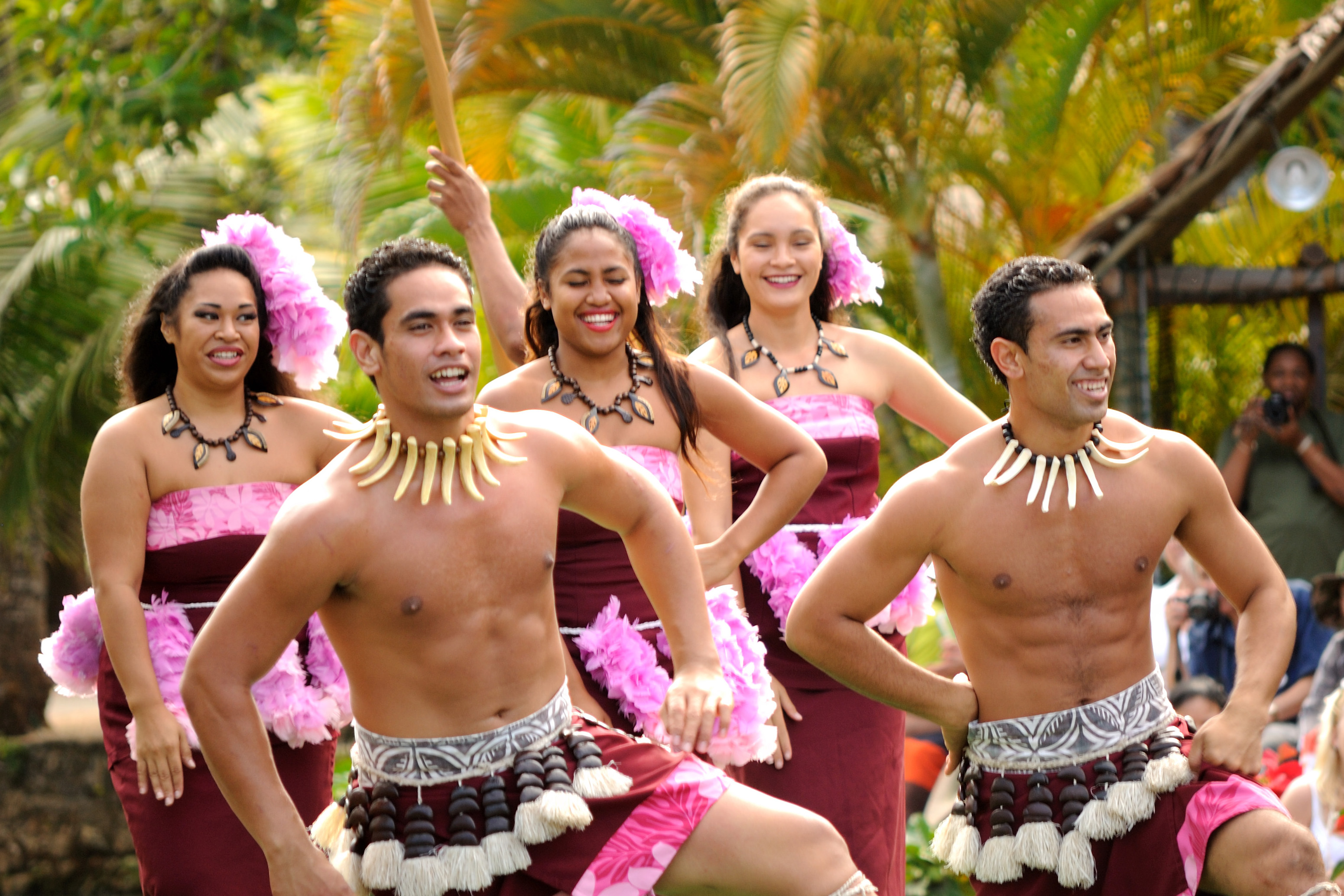
- Samoan canoe performers

Total population
- c. 700,000-800,000

Regions with significant populations
- Oceania
- United States: 243,682
- Samoa: c. 205,557
- New Zealand: 218,069
- Australia: 98,029
- American Samoa: 47,910
- Canada: 1,100
- United Kingdom: 250
- Italy: 119
- Tokelau: 100
- Japan: 73
- Brazil: 48
- Taiwan: 3

Languages
- Samoan, English, German (Historically)

Religion
- Christianity, traditional faith

Related ethnic groups
- Other Polynesians, Samoan Australians, Samoan New Zealanders

Samoans or Samoan people (Samoan: tagata Sāmoa) are the Indigenous Polynesian people of the Samoan Islands, an archipelago in Polynesia, who speak the Samoan language. The group's home islands are politically and geographically divided between the Independent State of Samoa and American Samoa, an unincorporated territory of the United States of America. Though divided by national borders, the culture and language are the same.

The Samoan people and culture form a vital link and stepping stone in the formation and spread of Polynesian culture, language and religion throughout Eastern Polynesia.

Polynesian trade, religion, war, and colonialism are important markers within Polynesian culture that are almost certainly rooted in the Samoan culture. Samoa's ancient history with the kingdom of Tonga, chiefdoms of Fiji and French Polynesia form the basis of modern Polynesian culture.

== Social organization ==
Among the many parts of Samoan society, three are described below: The matai (chief), the aiga (family head), and the untitled aumaga (laborers) and their manaia (supervisor).

=== Matai ===
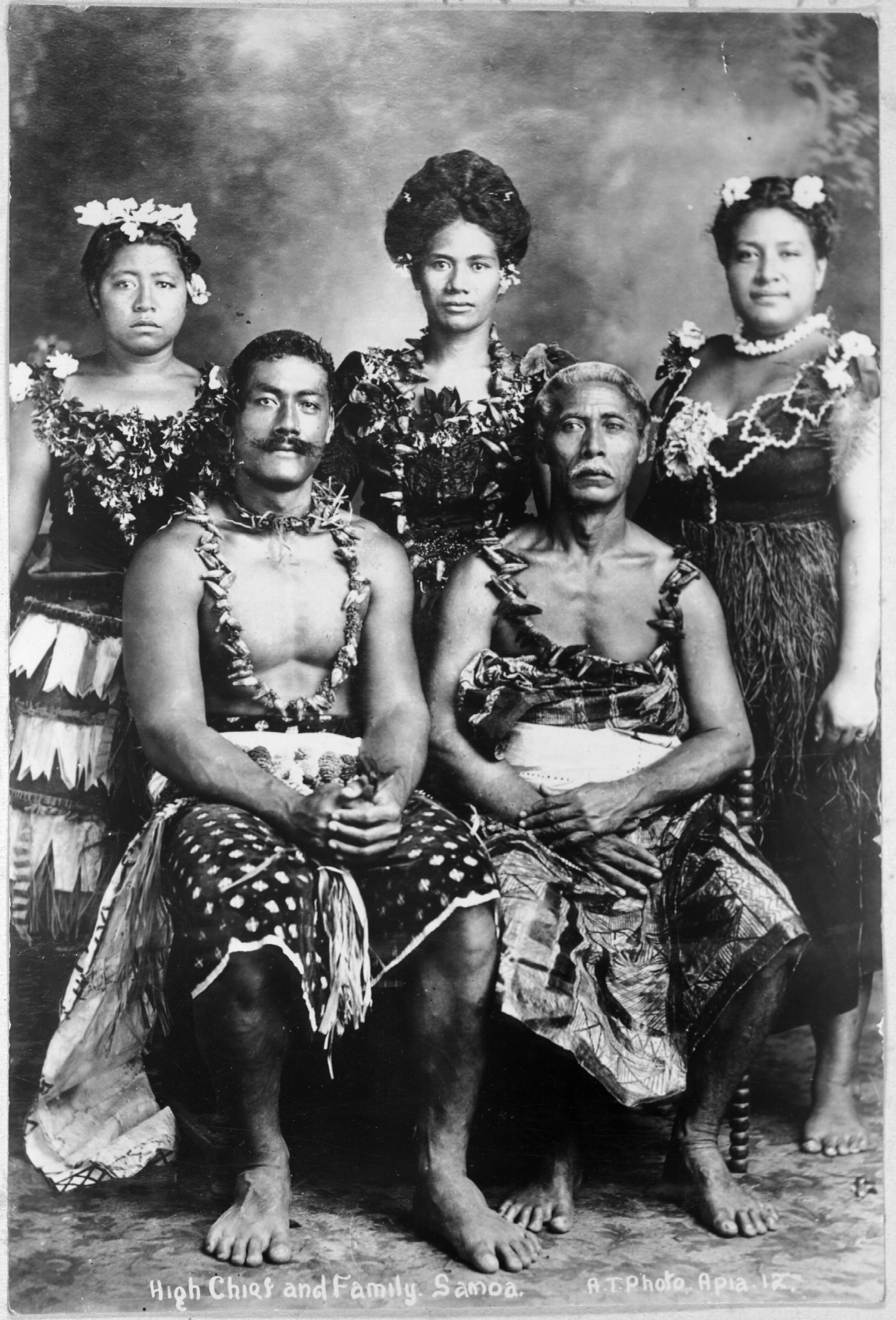
Samoan chief and family, c. 1914

Matai, otherwise known as the head of the family and extended family, is a very important figure in the Samoan culture. There are many aspects that go into fully understanding the term Matai, such as how one is elected and what their role is.

==== Matai role ====
A matai is expected to take his or her place amongst a network of other matai that govern a village or a family. Depending on the type of matai title he or she holds, and how that title ranks amongst other titles, each matai should lend their voice to deliberations and decisions made by the village or family council. They encourage warm family relations, offer advice, direct religious participation, and oversee disputes. As well as watching over the family land and representing the family in village affairs. Overall, a matai must have different demeanor than everyone else, especially other men in the family. Matais are also in charge of economic situations. For example, a matai must manage the amount of food his family brings in and must store some away for when times are hard. The matai’s job as a leader is one that is very important in Samoan culture and helps the overall structure stay in place.

==== Matai election ====
The election of a Matai is a lengthy process that can last up to several weeks and is often a highly competitive race. In this race different branches from each family put forth a candidate, accompanied by reasons why they would be a good candidate. These reasons range from the candidate's wisdom to wealth, including highly praised values such as negotiating, ritual knowledge, politics and economics. However, if the son of a matai meets these requirements, he is typically given a major edge in the race. Another advantage the son of a matai or any man in the matai’s household is given is being able to observe and help the matai starting from a young age. Most men considered for the Matai position are at least 40 years old, meaning many young candidates don't even stand a chance. One strategy that can be used by any man aspiring to become a matai is to choose to live in a household that has no other men, or to move to his wife's household if there are no men in her family's household either.

The election of a matai is under the guidance of another matai who is related to the family, allowing for a fair election. Once a new matai is chosen, a feast is thrown for the family, followed by a bigger feast for the whole village at a later date. At the larger feast, the matai is expected to give a traditional inaugural speech, displaying his abilities to speak publicly, his wisdom and retelling of Samoan myths. Throughout this speech he is watched by village council, as well as all the other matais in the village. Once the matai has proved himself to the other matai’s by giving the traditional address, he is called on to serve the community as a whole. The newly elected matai is expected to host a village-wide feast where he is tasked with providing food for the meal, as well as getting the other matais gifts.

Once this task is completed the newly elected matai is officially considered the matai of his household and will hold the position for the rest of his life, should he lead correctly. In certain cases where a matai is deemed cruel or ineffective, the title is stripped and a new matai is elected. However, a more often occurrence is the current matai becoming elderly or ill and requesting that a new matai be elected in order for there to be a more stable and effective leadership in place.

=== Chief ===
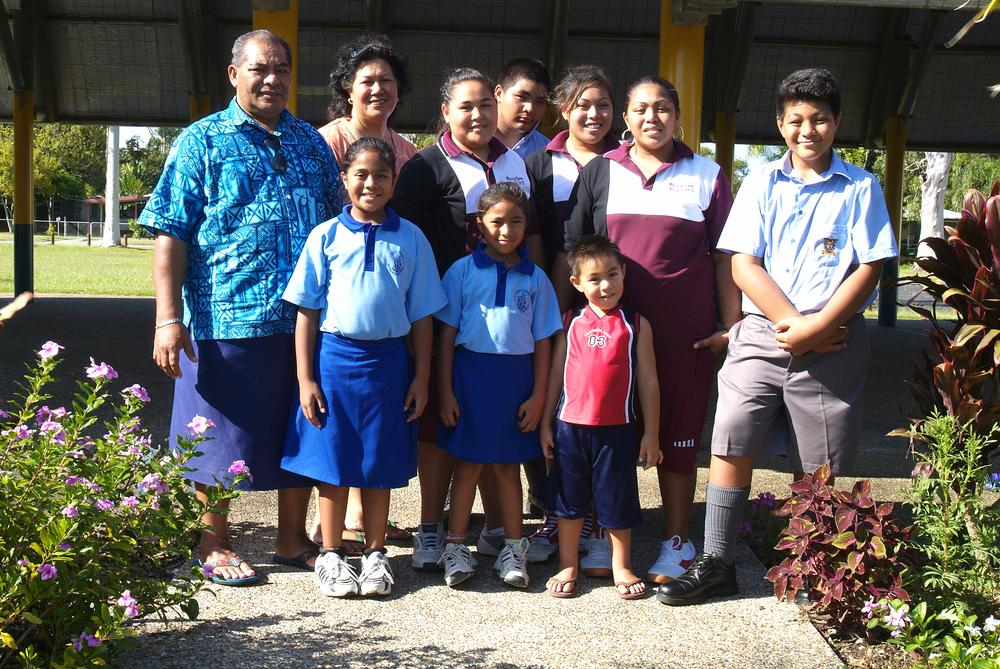
Samoan family in 2003

The main leader of each individual household is named the Chief of the family. One person, usually a male figure, is elected to become the Chief of his extended family.

==== Chief election ====
Elections take place after the former Chief has died or is no longer able to fulfill his duties, either for ethical reasonings or old age. Elections are a long and strenuous process for members of the extended family. For one portion of the family is going up against the other portion, leading to tensions within the whole family.

==== Chief role ====
Each Chief is the executor of their extended family's land. On that piece of land, families live, grow crops, cook and do other household chores. Also on that piece of land is where the matai resides.

Due to the large amount of households within a single village, there are a large amount of Chiefs. So much so that some are able to trace back their aiga timeline over a dozen different generations. The reasoning for the large amount of Chiefs is that the title could be claimed through blood ties, marriage, and adoption.

=== The aumaga and their manaia ===
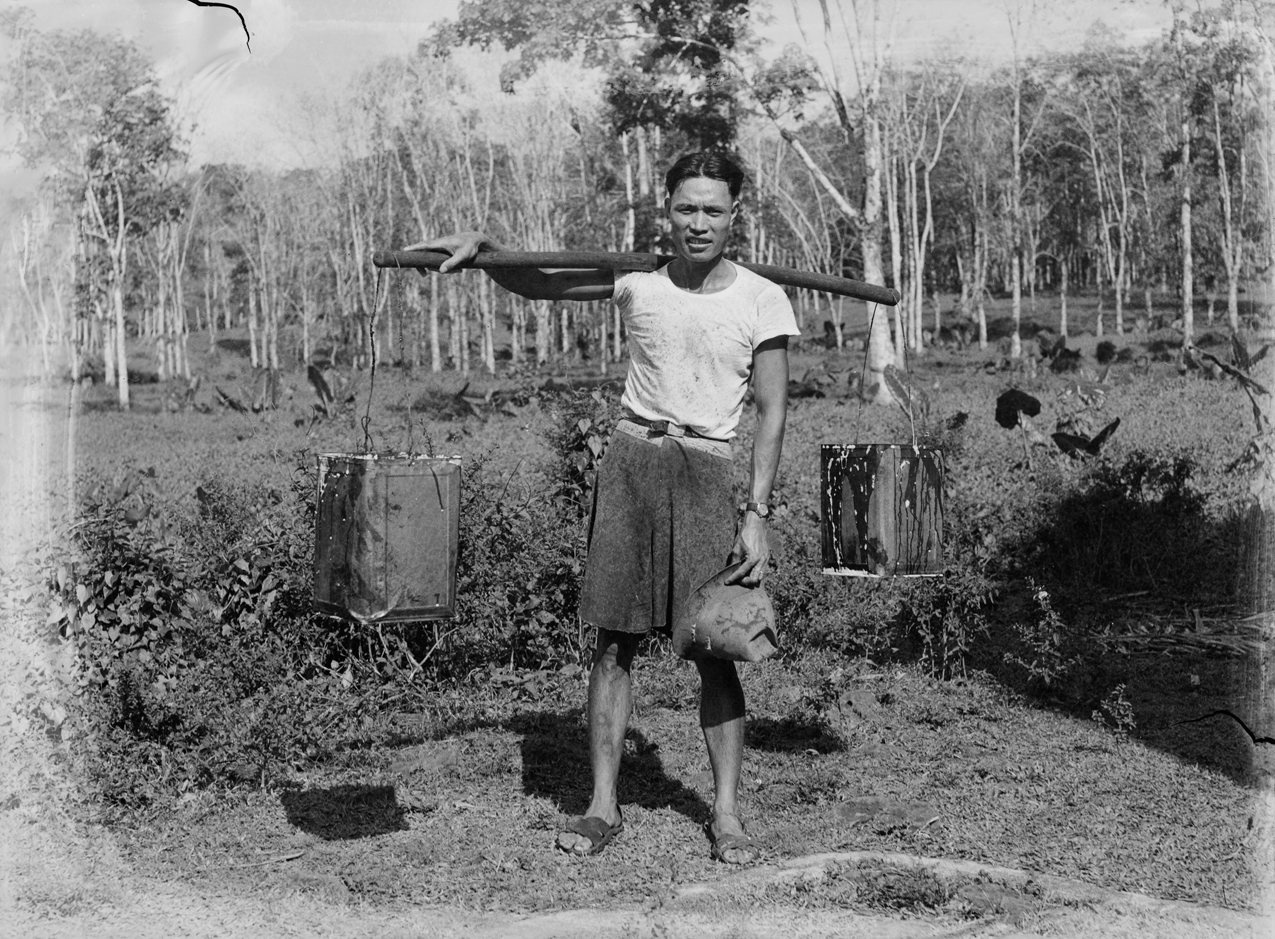
Samoan man carrying two containers over his shoulder

While chiefs, talking chiefs and matais all have a title, there are men in the village that are untitled. These men are placed in a group called the aumaga.

These men are the labor core of the community as they perform most of the heavy labor. The aumaga are tasked with building houses, repairing roads, planting and harvesting gardens, fishing, and cutting and selling coconut meat. The aumaga also have ceremonial responsibilities, such as helping the chief in ritual cooking and serving the food at ceremonies.

They also serve as informal keepers of the peace, interacting with each other as a large group of friends. They often play cards, cricket or gather for dances and parties with each other.

The aumaga are supervised by a relative of the chief, called the manaia (supervisor), who helps organize the aumaga and plan their activities. Despite not always truly being the son of the matai (chief), the manaia is still called “son” by the matai.

== Migration ==
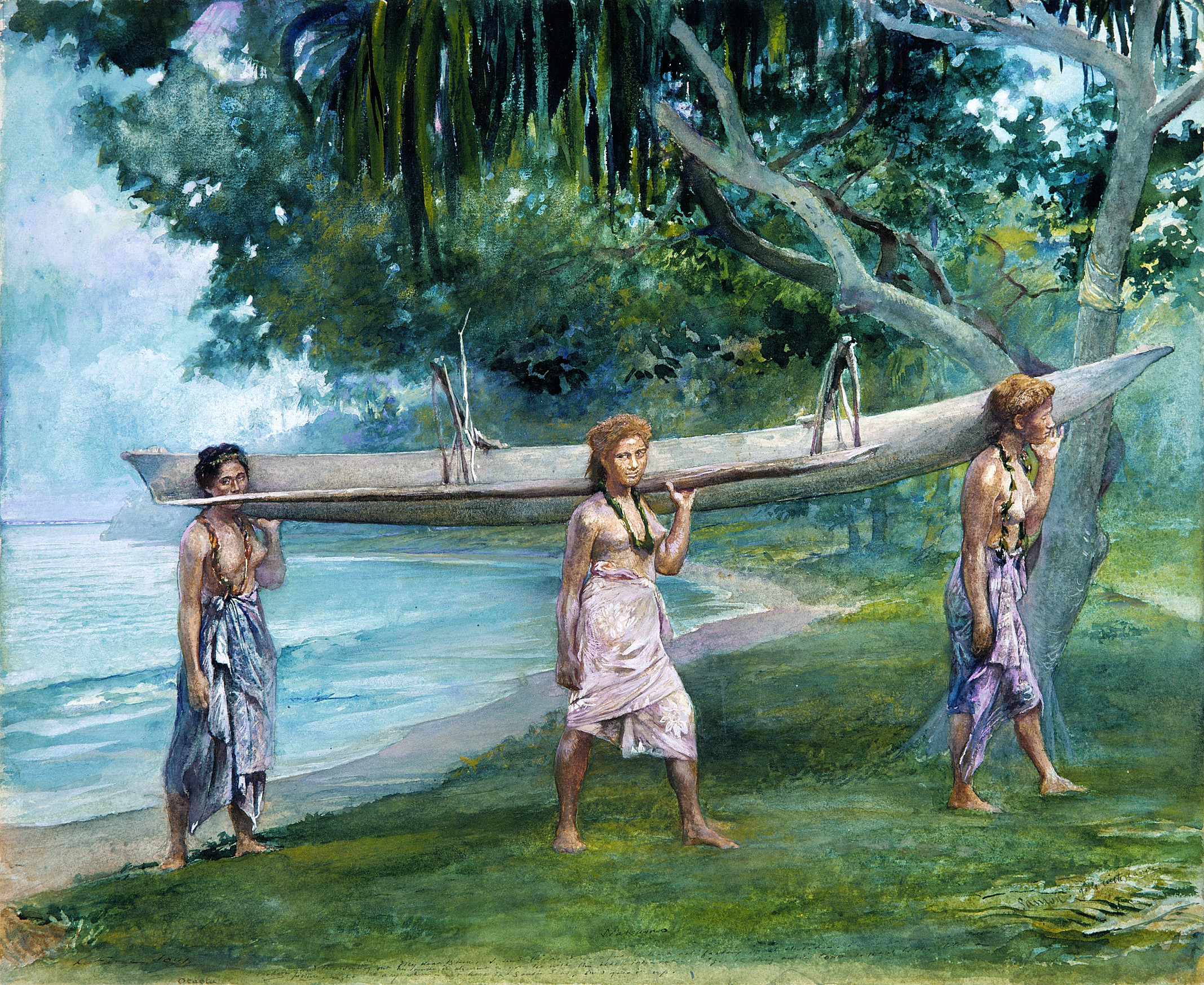
Portrait of Samoan women carrying a canoe

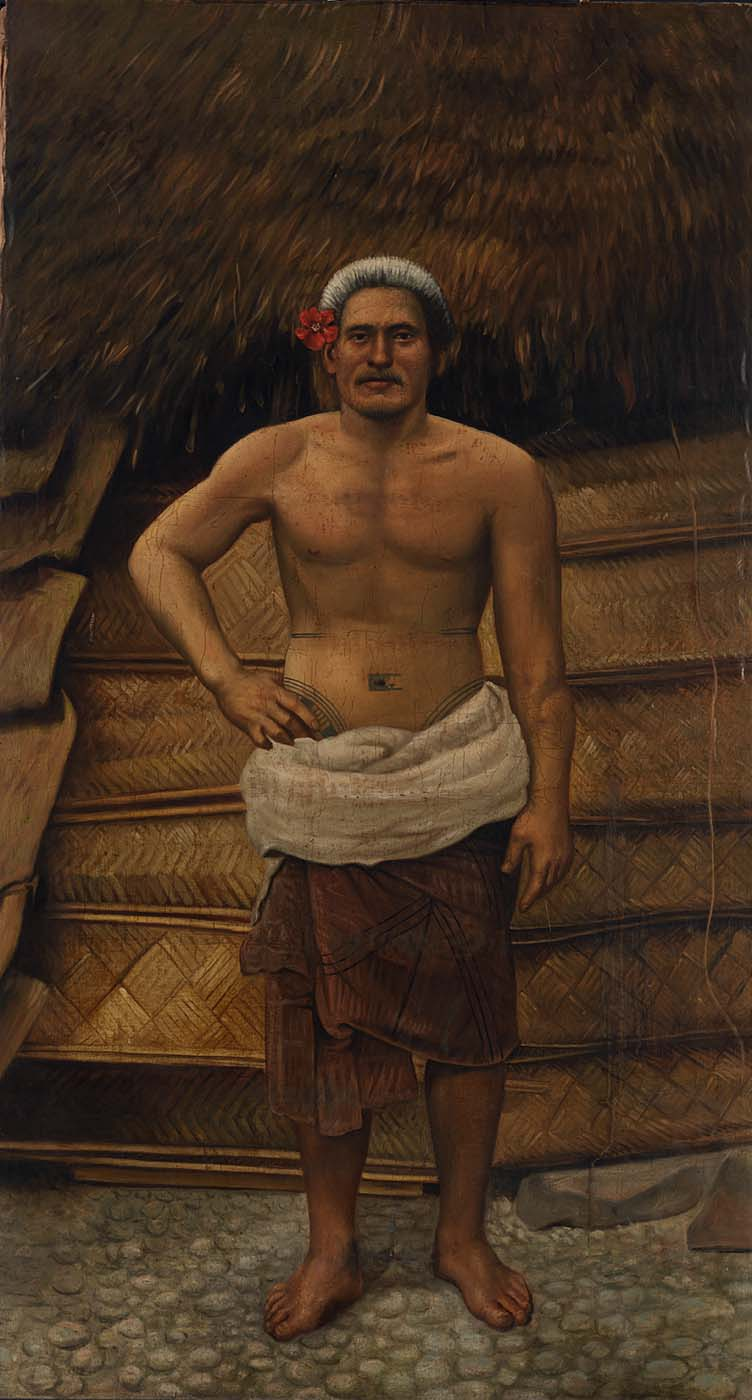
Portrait of a Samoan man by Antonion Zeno Shindler

Although the Samoan natives (Tagata Māo‘i) have long claimed to be the indigenous people of their islands — holding firm to the belief that Samoans were birthed from a tear in the heavens (Lagi, Lani) special creation in Samoa — it has been theorized by many linguists and anthropologists, based on linguistic commonalities as well as archaeological findings, that migrants from Maritime Southeast Asia via Island Melanesia arrived in the Samoan Islands approximately 3500 years ago, settling in what has come to be known as Polynesia further to the east.

It is possible, as the natives suggest, that the Samoan Islands were settled some time before 1000 BC and that the original settlement predates the arrival of those to whom the pottery was culturally relevant. It is also generally a wide spread cultural belief throughout Samoa that the islands were the central base point for the beginning of the great voyages, the Polynesian expansion to the East and South.

These stories and legends are recorded in print by European historians, anthropologists, archaeologists and still spoken of in contemporary times by Samoan high chiefs in their great speeches and decrees during kava ceremonies and chiefly/ royal ceremonies.

The voyages still spoken of in ancient Polynesian chieftain oratory poetics (lauga) are called 'taeao'; a recalling of past histories and contacts within the Polynesian archipelago by Samoan oral high chiefs. These 'taeaos' include oral and written accounts of familial tribal/clan contacts with the neighboring islands of:

- Tokelau (New Zealand)
- Tuamotu (French Polynesia)
- Huahine (French Polynesia)
- Tahiti (French Polynesia)
- Ha'apai (Tonga)
- Vava'u (Tonga)
- Rarotonga (Cook Islands)
- Pukapuka (Cook Islands)
- Tuvalu
- Havai'i (Hawaii)
- Futuna (France)
- Uvea (France)
- Rotuma (Fiji)
- Vanua Levu (Fiji)

Early contact with Europeans was established in the 18th century. Christianity was formally introduced with the arrival of L.M.S. Christian missionaries in August 1830.

During the early 20th century the Samoan Islands were colonized by Germany, Great Britain and the USA. Tutuila and Aunu'u islands were settled by the US and later joined by the Kingdom of Manu'a (1904) to become the current Territory of American Samoa. The western islands became German Samoa. In 1914, New Zealand forces captured the islands from Germany, renaming them Western Samoa. Western Samoa regained its independence on January 1, 1962. In 1997 it formally changed its name to Samoa.

== Marriage and family ==
=== Marriage ===
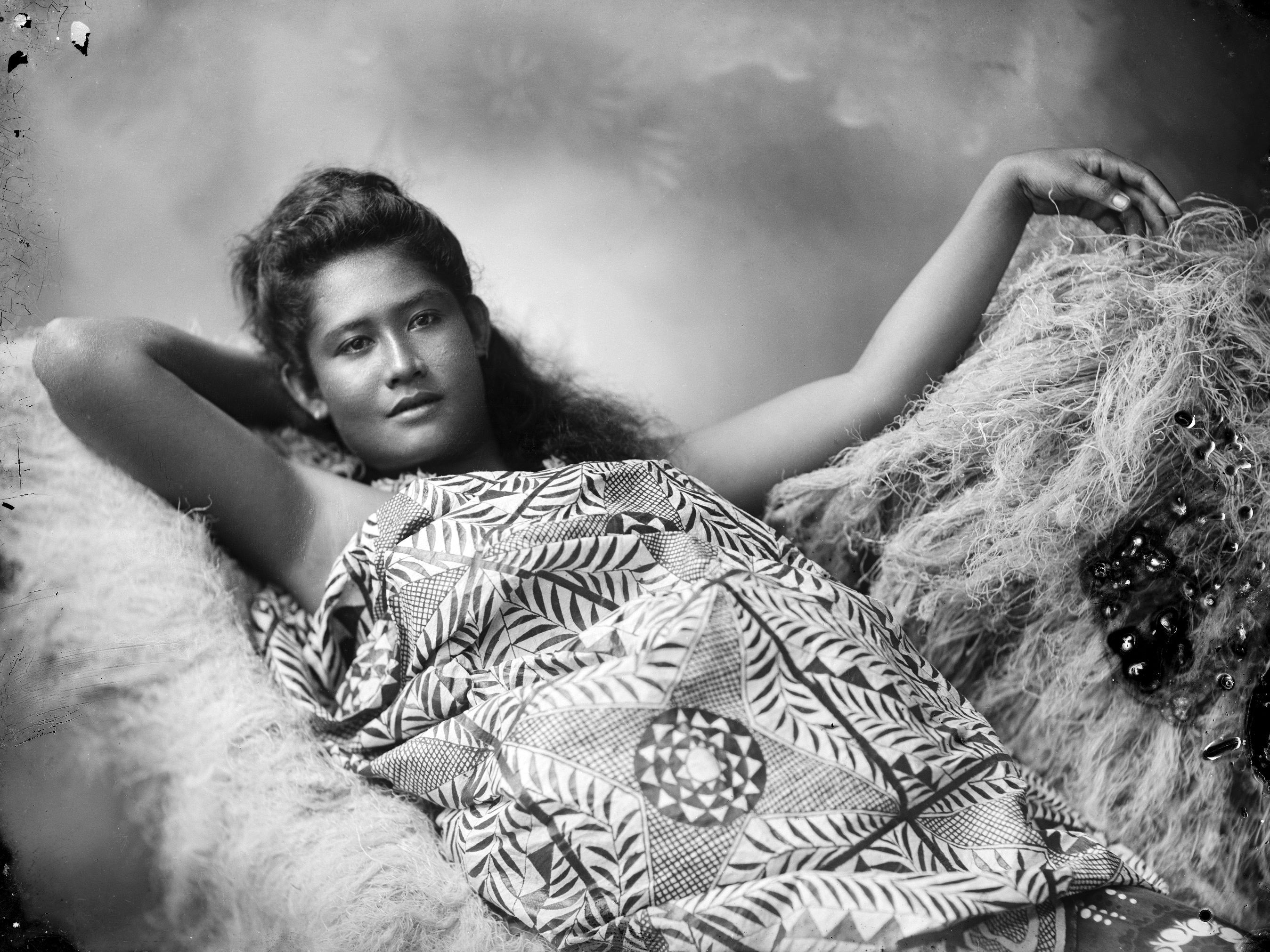
Samoan girl wearing an elaborate Lavalava

Marriage ceremonies are important Samoan cultural events. Marriage involves the transfer of property of the woman, the toga, and the man's property, the oloa. It is a village event, with two ceremonies and a feast at the conclusion. In the first ceremony, the bride and groom march through the village to a district judge. The judge then conducts a civil ceremony. Concluding that official ceremony, the newlyweds next gather in a church where a religious ceremony is performed by a member of the church. At a feast, families provide food from all over the village. After the conclusion of the wedding, the newlyweds choose which side of the family they would like to live with. After moving in with a particular family, they are expected to do work around the land and the house to help provide for their family.

When families have children, they too are expected to help with duties and chores around the land, by age three or four. The young girls take care of other children and housework, while the boys help with cultivation, animals and water gathering. By the time the children reach the age of seven or eight, they are expected to know and be acclimated to the life and chores of the Samoan culture. This includes being adept at "agriculture, fishing, cooking, and child care" along with a multitude of other chores that their elders have directed them to do. As the Samoans grow up, they are given the most tasks and responsibilities they can hold, until they can take over fully for the aging members of their extended family.

=== Funerals ===
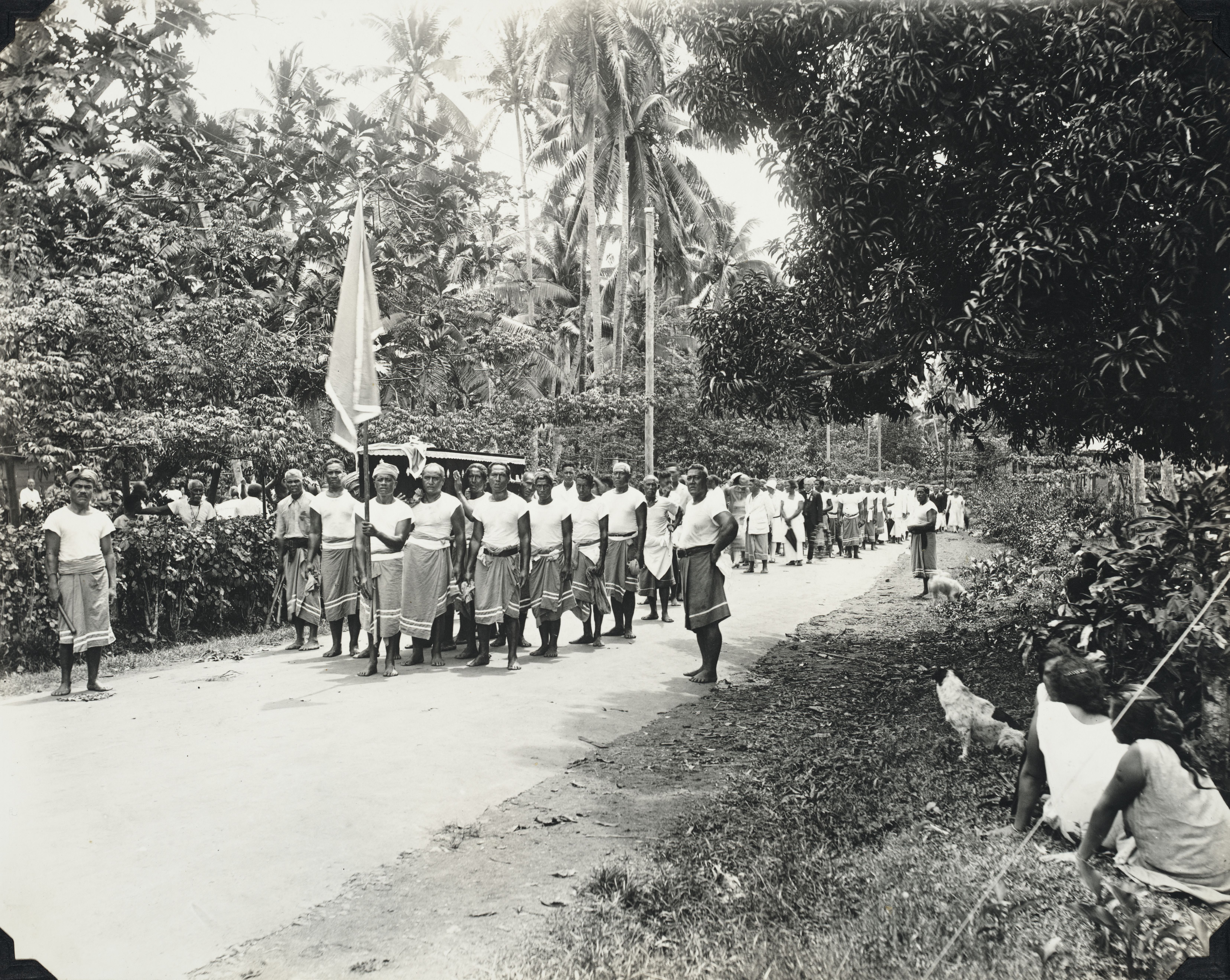
Funeral procession of Mau leader, Tamasese Lealofi II in Samoa in 1930

When a member of extended family dies, the funeral preparations start almost immediately. Choirs are directed to the mourner's land. The deceased body is bathed and dressed in white. They are placed on woven mats before the funeral less than 24-hours later. During those 24-hours, at least one family member has to stay with the deceased. A feast concludes the event, with food being served to mourners and people who helped with the burial. Other family members take over the responsibilities of the deceased while still serving their own personal chores around the land.

== Land ==
The elected Matai of the community is the controller of every portion of a village land. The village Matai says what cultivators will do with land and "hold sway over allocation of plots and the ways in which those plots are used." The only aspect the Matai does not control is who the land will go to after his death. This is to avoid it being controlled by one family for a long period of time. There are four categories that land is divided: Village House Lots, Underbrush, Family Reserve and Village Land.

=== House village lots ===
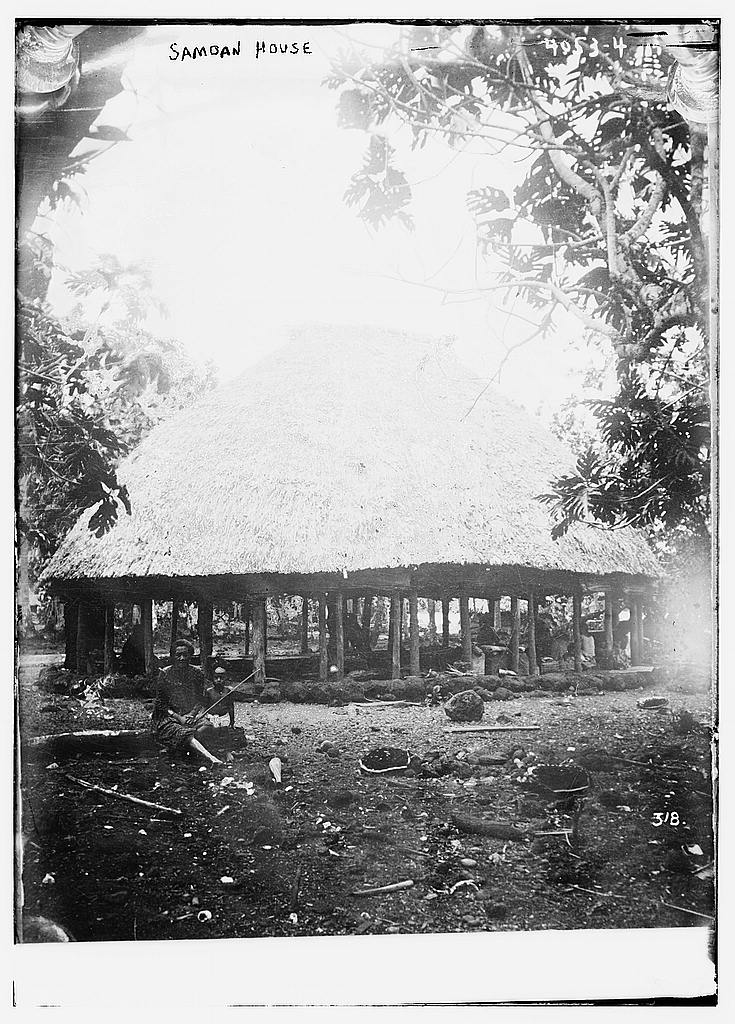
A Samoan house under construction in the early portions of the 1900s. Samoan houses consist of three separate quarters, including the main sleeping quarters, a guest house, and latrines.

Village house lots is where individual houses or huts of single person or family lives. These houses are built in clusters. The clusters include multiple different aspects, but all look the same. Each house includes a main sleeping house, a guest house and a latrine. Yards with trees and gardens make up the house village lot, with some lots containing the entirety of the extended family.

=== Underbrush ===
The underbrush covers the entirety of the land. These plots of land are recognizable to all villagers and are separated by boundaries. Boundaries are usually made up from a variety of rocks, streams, trees and plants. It is very easy to distinguish the different properties owned by separate families.

=== Family reserve ===
Family reserve sections are where crops are cultivated. The biggest amount of crops grown within the Samoan culture is taro leaves and yams. These plots are available to be shared with other villages and other families. However, they would be no longer classified as a family reserve but regarded as owning the crops but not the land. The family reserve is not cultivated as much as other sources of property. This is due to the fact that crops grown here are able to grow quickly and easily without many interruptions.

=== Village land ===
Village land is the least cultivated and most shared portion of land in Samoan villages. To be able to plant here requires permission from the village council. This is because "the land is community property and not family owned". Village land is the biggest aspect of any figure of land and is where hunting for food, such as wild pig and birds are allowed. Fishing is also an aspect that is allowed within village land.

== Culture ==
=== Tattooing ===
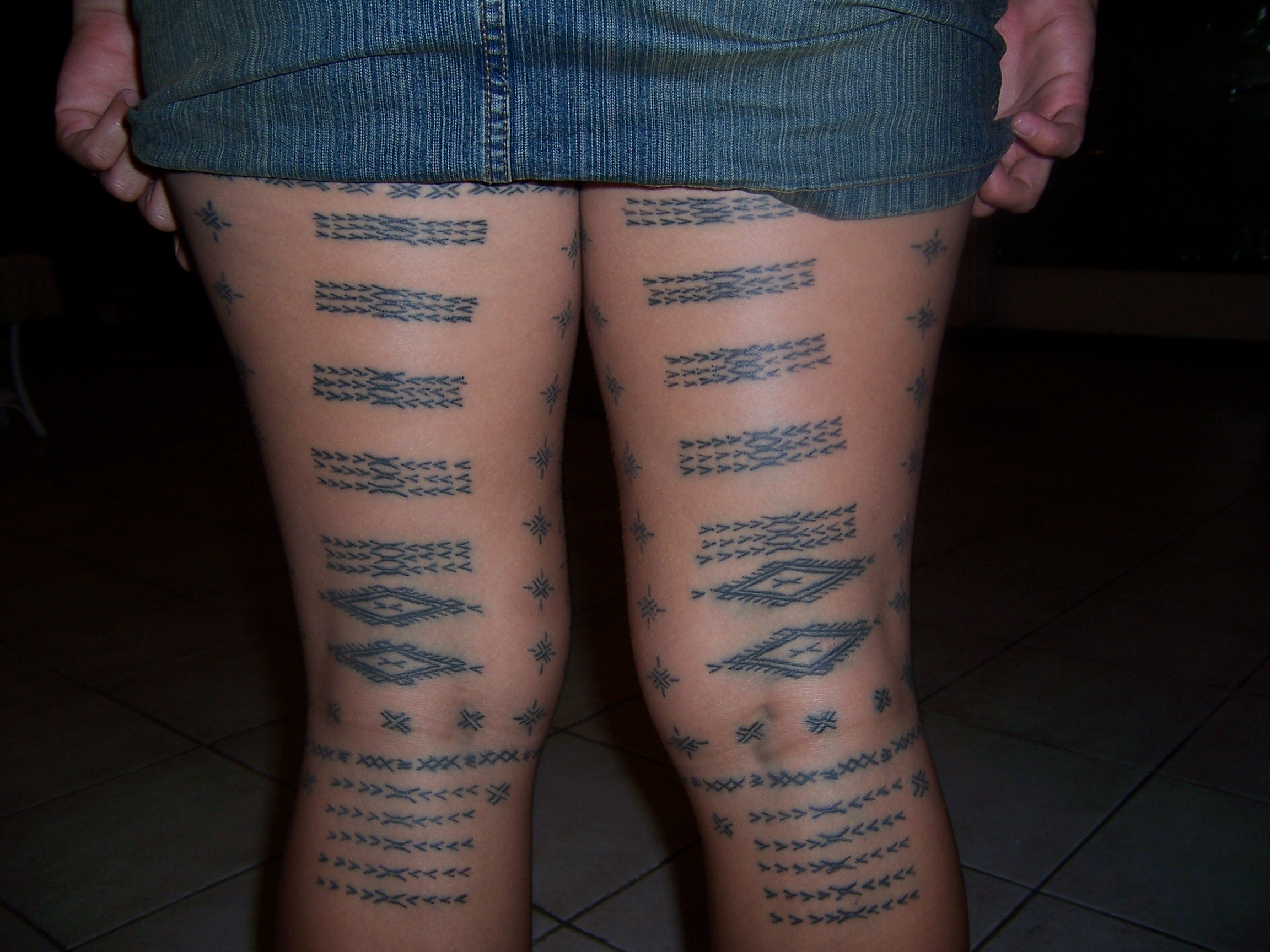
Samoan Malu

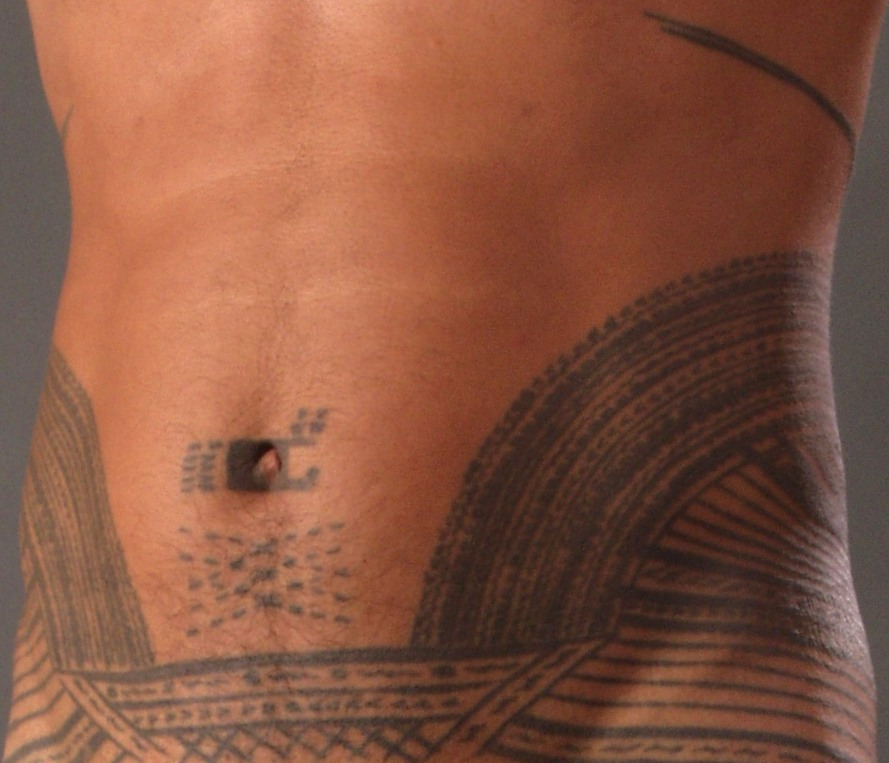
Samoan Pe'a – front detail

Traditional Samoan tattoo (tatau), pe'a (male tatau), malu (female tatau), demonstrate the strong ties many Samoans feel for their culture. Samoans have practiced the art of tattooing men and women for over 2,000 years. To this day, a man's tattoo extensively covers from mid-back, down the sides and flanks, to the knees. A woman's tattoo is not as extensive or heavy. The geometric patterns are based on ancient designs that often denote rank and status. The va'a (canoe), for example, stretches across a man's mid-back.

In Samoa's cultural past most males were tattooed between the ages of 14 and 18, when it was determined they had stopped growing, so the designs would not stretch and suffer in beauty. Today, there has been a strong revival of traditional tattooing in the past generation, not only in Samoa but throughout Polynesia, often as a symbol of cultural identity.

Tatau, the Samoan word for tattoo has a number of meanings including correct or rightness. It also signifies the correct quadrangular figures in reference to the fact that Samoan tattoo designs do not include circular lines, although other Polynesian tattoo motifs do. Early Englishmen mispronounced the word tatau and borrowed it into popular usage as tattoo.

Traditional tattooing is a painful process. The Samoan tattoo master dips his cutting tools into black ink made from the soot of burnt candlenut shells and then punctures designs into the skin. The cutting tool consists of a short piece of bamboo or light wood with a piece of tortoiseshell bound at right angles at one end. A little bone comb is bound to the lower broad end of the tortoiseshell. The larger the comb, the greater the area on the skin is covered with fewer strokes. The master uses a small mallet to repeatedly tap a short-handled instrument. The process takes days and is sometimes partially accomplished over longer periods, with recuperation in between.

Tattoo designs have changed to include freehand symbols such as the kava bowl representing hospitality; the characterization of the Samoan house or fale signifying kinship; emblems of nature — shells, fish, birds, waves, centipedes; and the traditional geometric lines and angles of different lengths and sizes.

=== Music ===
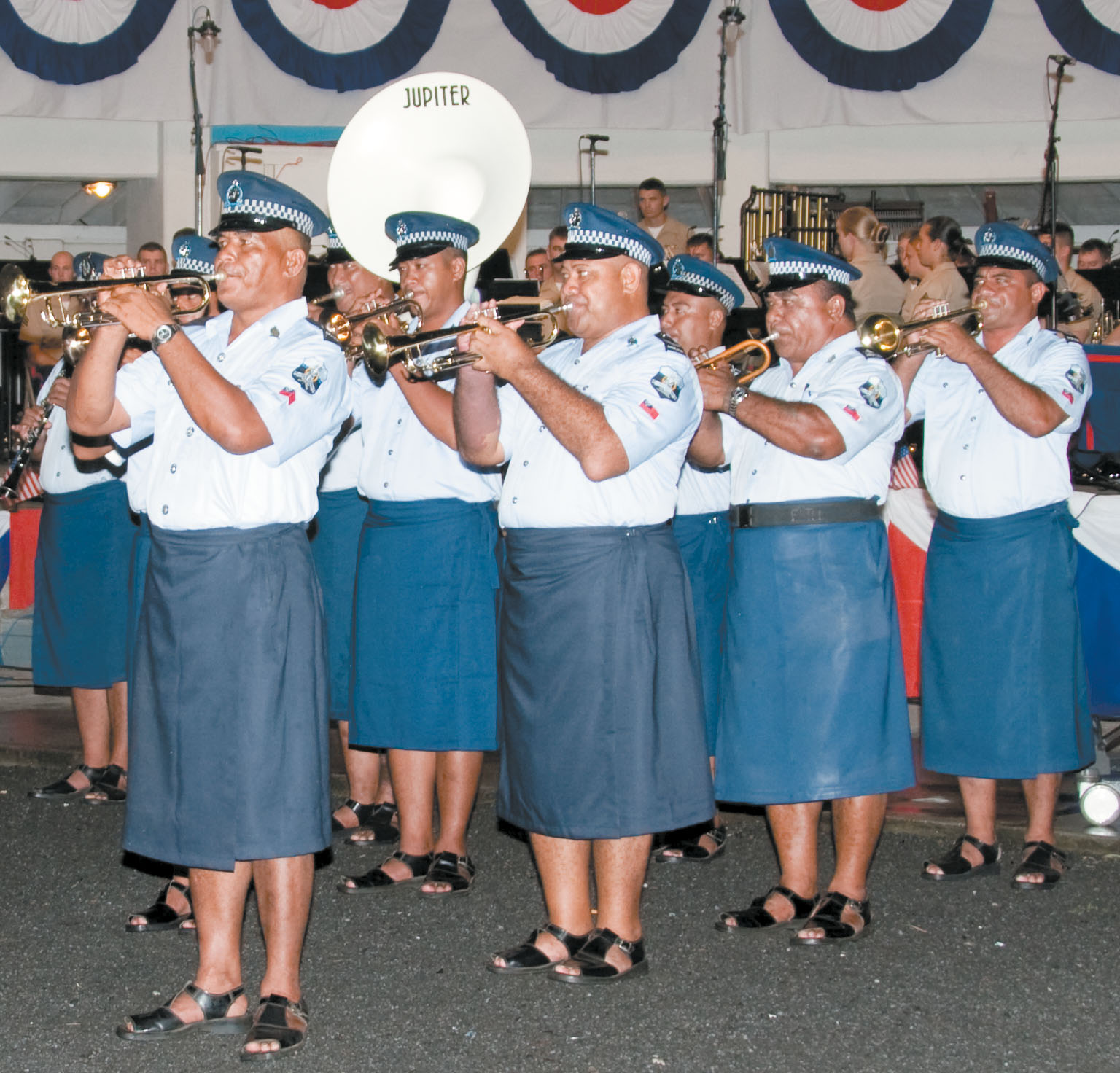
Samoa police band

Modern pop and rock have a large audience in Samoa, as do several native bands; these bands have abandoned most elements of Samoan traditional music, though there are folky performers. Recently, the population has seen a resurgence of old Samoan songs, remixed in the style of reggae but with some traditional elements, such as the use of the pate and old chord structure.

Initially in Samoan music,

"there were just two instruments in use; the pate, a hollowed out log drum that comes in various sizes, and the fala, a rolled up mat beaten with sticks. In addition to this was the human voice. This limited range of instrumentation had no effect on the importance of music in Samoan life. Because there was no written language many stories and legends were propagated through song and the complex rhythms from the pate are essential in the performance of many Samoan dances. In fact in many dances, the dancers themselves add to the rhythm by clapping their hands, and dependent upon the way in which the hand is held produce a range of different sounds. Two instruments were developed that are now synonymous with Samoan music, the selo and the ukulele. The selo is a stringed instrument made from a broomstick, or similar object, attached to a large box, bucket or other object that acts as a sounding board. A single length of string joins the top of the stick to the box, which is plucked to produce a sound similar to that of a bass. The ukele is a small guitar-like instrument but with only four strings. It can be found in two forms, one which is like a miniaturised guitar, the other where the body is made from half a coconut shell."

Western string instruments such as guitars are widely available across the Pacific Islands, with many bands performing and recording acoustic and amplified music in Samoa since the 1970s. Younger generations continue to perform in string bands as well as gravitate toward genres such as reggae, hip hop, rhythm and blues, gospel and soul.

In Samoa, music is a big part of their culture. Traditional Samoan music still has a purpose and a function in today's society, but has partially given way to contemporary or externally-influenced genre of Samoan music. Of them are high mixture of Reggae and Hawaiian music which can also illuminate as an important influence on Samoa. There are many popular musicians who hail from, or who are of Samoan descent. They include the likes of Reggae artist: J Boog, the hip hop group: Boo-Yaa T.R.I.B.E., and one of the most recognizable bands of Samoa: The Five Stars. Opera singer Jonathan Lemalu was a co-recipient of the Grammy Award for Best Opera Recording for his work on "Britten: Billy Budd" at the 52nd Grammy Awards. Samoa is home to the guitar style of fingerpicking which is in known in the islands as “Le Igi”. It hails from Hawaii and is known to their people as “Slack Key Guitar”. One traditional instrument of Samoa is known as the Fala. It is made up of rolled “wicker style mats” and is beaten with drum sticks to make the sound of a drum. Another instrument popular in Samoa is a form of drum called the Pate. It is originally from Tahiti and introduced to Samoa about 500 years ago. It is made of wood from and carved with tribal references or designs.

=== Dance ===
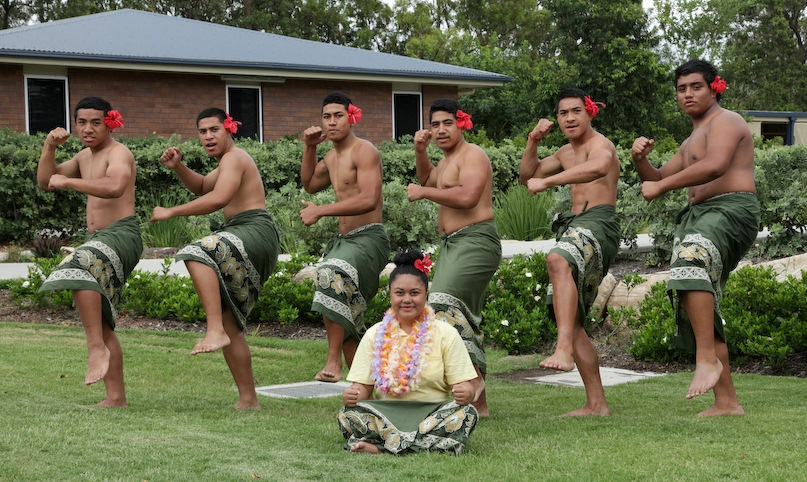
Samoans on Harmony Day

The Fire knife dance or Siva Afi is the most popular Samoan dance among tourists in Samoa. The Fa'ataupati or slap dance, performed by men, consists of fierce slapping of the body in rhythmic motion to drum beats. Other Samoan dances include the Maulu'ulu, which is an all-female dance that is more elegant. The Sasa is a dance that can be performed by both men and women in a seated position or standing. The Siva Tau is a war dance performed by Samoan sporting teams before each match. The Taualuga, a celebratory siva, and center of Samoan culture, has been adopted and altered throughout Western Polynesia. Traditionally performed by the virgin highborn son or daughter of a Samoan chief, a taupou (female) or manaia (male) will dress in full festive attire for the siva. Usually consisting of a finely woven ie'toga mat decorated with feathers of the "sega"(collared lory or blue crowned lorikeet). However, modern performances primarily consist of dyed chicken feathers. Performers also dress in a surplus of anklets and armbands made of ti leaves, sea turtle shells (uga laumei), coconut shells, or boar's tusk. Followed by the crowning attire of the taupou or manaia, the headdress or "tuiga". Taupous or Manaias, are finished off with a drenching of coconut oil for cosmetic purposes. Throughout this performance, performers are accompanied by upbeat yet simple drum beats usually performed at a variety of cultural celebrations.

=== Sports ===
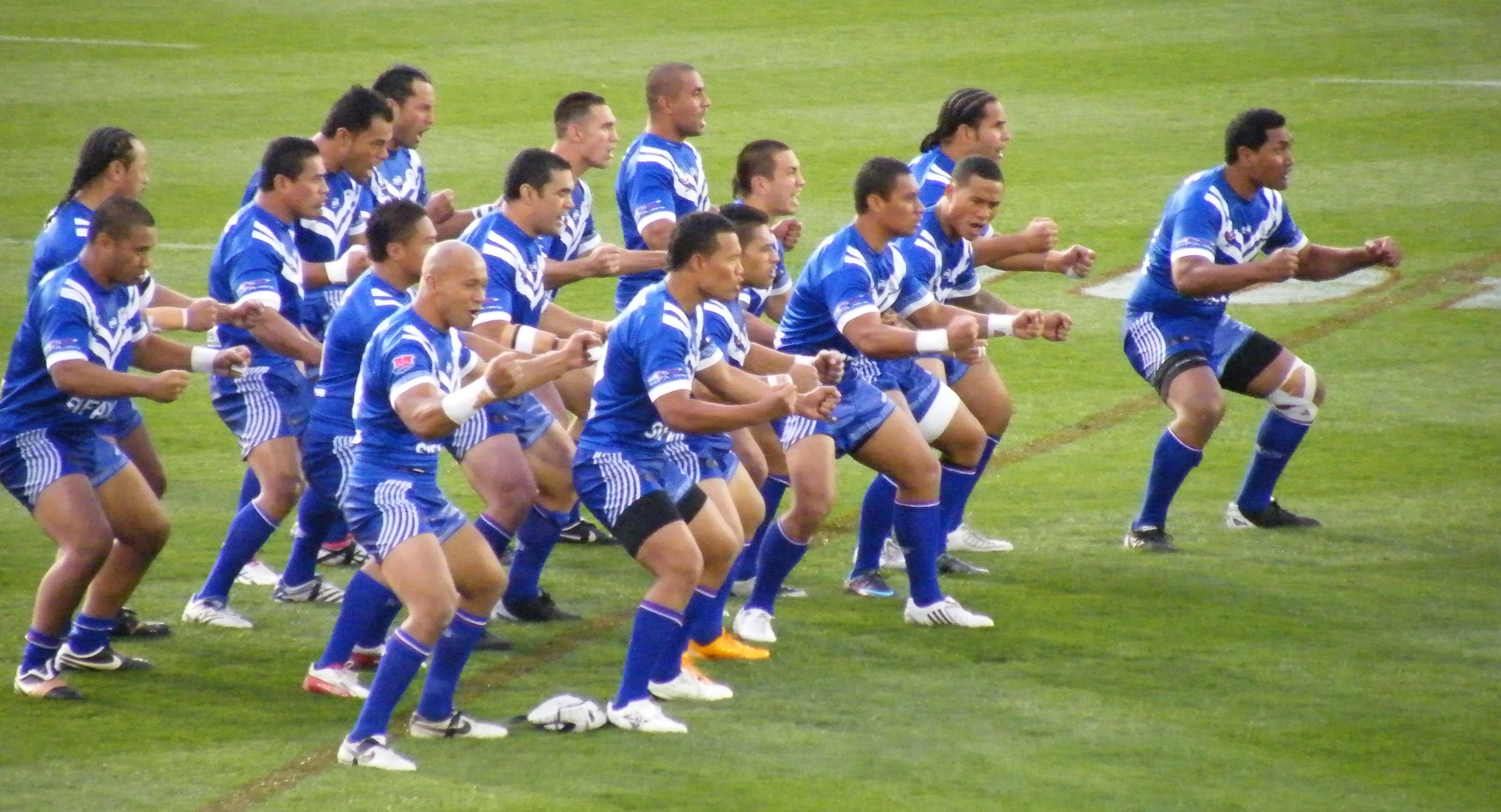
Samoa RLWC team performing a Siva Tau in 2008

Athletes of Samoan descent are widely known for their success in full-contact sports such as American football, rugby union, rugby league, boxing, professional wrestling, and mixed martial arts. Samoa is said to produce among the highest number of top-level rugby union and rugby league players per capita. American Samoa produces the highest number of NFL players and has been dubbed "Football Island" by mainland coaches and media. It's estimated that a boy born to Samoan parents is 56 times more likely to get into the NFL than any other boy in America. Wrestlers of Samoan heritage have had high representation within professional wrestling with Samoans winning championships across many major promotions including multiple world championships. Three Samoans have held the WWE Championship, one has held the WWE Women's championship, and one has held the AEW World Championship. A majority of these champions are members of the Samoan-American Anoaʻi family. Eight Samoans have been inducted into the WWE Hall of Fame. Samoans are also well represented in limited-contact and non-contact sports such as basketball, baseball, netball, soccer, and volleyball.

== Coming of Age in Samoa by Margaret Mead ==
Margaret Mead, an American anthropologist, is famous for her ethnography turned novel titled Coming of Age in Samoa. This ethnography has information on problems adolescents in Samoa face, and the approaches to understanding these problems. Mead wrote, "A Samoan village is made up of some thirty to forty households, each of which is presided over by a head man called a matai". Regarding Samoan social structures and rules, Mead wrote, "Until a child is six or seven at least she associates very little with her contemporaries." "The women," she observed, "are completely dependent upon their husbands for their status in this village group". Regarding attitudes toward female sexuality, Mead wrote, "Where parents of lower rank complacently ignore their daughters' experiments, the high chief guards his daughter's virginity as he guards the honor of his name".

== Notable people ==
- List of Samoans

== See also ==
- Samoan Americans
- Samoan Australians
- Samoan New Zealanders
