= Fialupe Felila Fiaui Lutu =

American Samoan civil servant and politician

Member of the American Samoa House of Representatives from the 5th district
- In office 2018–2019

Fialupe Felila Fiaui Lutu is an American Samoan civil servant and politician. On October 24, 2017, Lutu was elected to the American Samoa House of Representatives in a special election for the open District No. 5, Sua #1 seat. Prior to her election, Lutu served as the Chief Clerk of the House of Representatives for more than 10 years.

Lutu previously served as a deputy Secretary of the American Samoa Senate. She then became Chief Clerk of the American Samoa House of Representatives for more than 10 years. She retired as chief clerk in 2017 upon her election to the House of Representatives.

In 2017, incumbent American Samoa Rep. Puleleiite Liamatua Jr. resigned from his seat, representing District No. 5, Sua #1, to become CEO of the American Samoa Telecommunications Authority (ASTCA). A special election was announced to fill the vacancy in Liamatua's open seat. The winner would serve the remainder of Liamatua's unexpired term, which ends on January 3, 2019.

Lutu announced her candidacy for the open House of Representatives District No. 5, Sua #1 seat. At the time, Lutu told KHJ News that she had previously been approached to run for the seat and that she had discussed a potential campaign with her children. District No 5, Sua #1 includes the villages of Amaua, Alega, Avaio, Auto, Faga'itua, Lauli'i, Aumi, and Tafananai in Eastern District. Five other candidates also entered the race; Lutu was the only female candidate.

Fialupe Felila Fiaui Lutu won the Sua #1 special election to the House of Representatives on October 24, 2017, by defeating five other candidates for the seat. A total of 357 votes were cast in the special election. Lutu received 94 votes, or 26%, to win election to the House. Her closest opponent, Tuifagalilo Vele, placed second with 72 votes, or 20%, while Tuialofi Faalae Lauatuaa Tunupopo came in third place with 64 votes, or 18%. Rounding out the results were Laloniu P. Maloa, who came in fourth with 57 votes, or 16%; Uele Fale S Uele, who garnered 50 votes, or 14%; and Ketesemane Meaole, who received 20 votes, or 6%, to place sixth in the election. Results were certified on October 31, 2017.

During her term, Lutu was one of only two women serving in the American Samoa House of Representatives, the other being Representative Vui Florence Saulo, who represents Tuala-uta.

Lutu ran for reelection in 2018, but lost to Gene Luaitaua Pan.
