= Chris Vaefaga =

Former Samoa international rugby league footballer

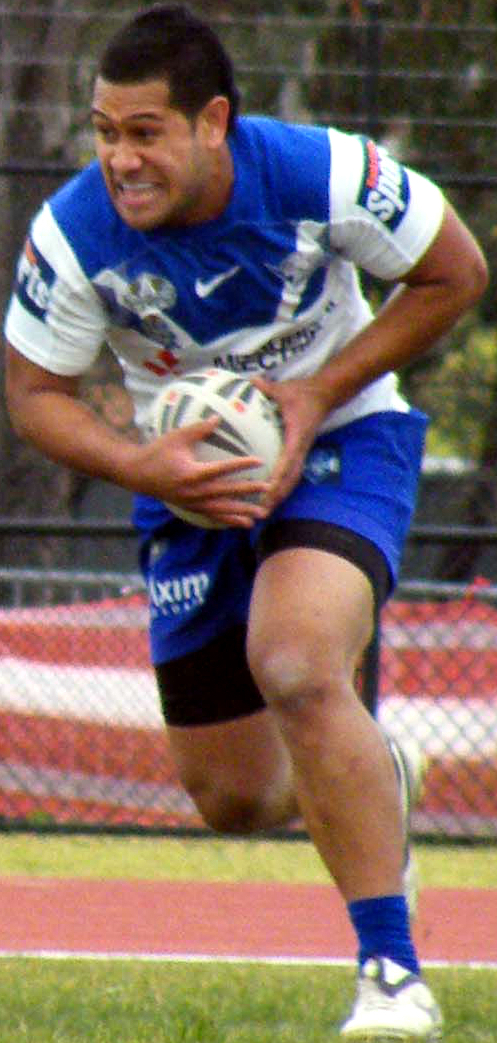

Personal information
- Full name: Christopher Vaefaga
- Born: 1 November 1987 (age 37); Auckland, New Zealand

Playing information
- Position: Lock, Five-eighth, Hooker
Representative
Years	Team	Pld	T	G	FG	P
2006–07	Samoa	7	1	0	0	4

Chris Vaefaga (born 1 November 1987) is a New Zealand professional rugby league footballer for the Bulldogs in the National Rugby League. He plays at lock or five-eighth. He is a Samoa international.

== Background ==
Chris Vaefaga was born in Auckland, New Zealand
