= Liufau Sonoma =

American Samoan politician

Liufau Tanielu Sonoma Unutoa (died August 4, 2009) was an American Samoan politician.

Sonoma served as high chief of the village of Aua, American Samoa. He also served in the American Samoa Senate. Sonoma worked as a meteorologist for the National Oceanic and Atmospheric Administration
