= Pasi Schwalger =

Samoan footballer

Personal information
- Full name: Pasi Abraham Schwalger
- Date of birth: 16 October 1982 (age 44)
- Place of birth: Mulinuʻu, Samoa
- Height: 1.90 m (6 ft 3 in)
- Position: Goalkeeper

Senior career*
| Years | Team | Apps | (Gls) |
| 2000–2004 | Preston Lions | 58 | (0) |
| 2005–2006 | Green Gully Cavaliers | 48 | (0) |
| 2007 | Heidelberg United | 17 | (0) |
| 2008 | Fawkner Blues | 19 | (0) |
| 2009 | Werribee City FC | 7 | (0) |
| 2010 | Heidelberg United | 0 | (0) |

International career
| 2007 | Samoa | 4 | (0) |
- * Club domestic league appearances and goals

Pasi Schwalger (born 16 October 1982) is a Samoan Australian former football and Australian rules football player. He has represented Samoa internationally in soccer.

== Career ==
Schwalger was born in Mulinuʻu, but played in Australia for most of his career. He initially played as a goalkeeper for the Preston Lions. In 2004 he traveled to England for trials with Southend United, but was not selected after Southend hired a pair of goalkeepers. He left the Preston Lions in the following off-season, moving to the Green Gully Cavaliers.

In May 2004 he was selected for the Samoa national team for the 2004 OFC Nations Cup and World Cup qualifiers. In 2007 he was selected for the team for the 2007 South Pacific Games in Apia. He was part of Samoa's 7–0 victory over American Samoa.

In 2008 he played with the Fawkner Blues. In 2009 he played for Werribee City FC, but traveled to Greece in April for a trial with an unnamed first-division club. In November 2009 he announced he was switching codes to Australian rules football, saying that he had had enough of soccer and "[did]n't have the drive and motivation to do it any more". After an initial approach by Bacchus Marsh Football Club coach David Callendar, he subsequently began training with suburban Melbourne club Heidelberg Football Club. On 20 March 2010, Schwalger suffered an ACL injury sidelining him for the year. He moved to Bacchus Marsh in 2011. In 2014, he played in an Essendon District Football League (EDFL) Premiership with Division 1 club, West Coburg.
