= Samoa Public Service Association =

PSA
- Samoa Public Service Association
- Faalapotopotoga Tagata Faigaluega Malo Samoa
- Headquarters: Apia, Samoa
- Location: Samoa
- Members: 600 (in 2021)
- Key people: Karamellie Tuala, general secretary

The Samoa Public Service Association (PSA; Samoan: Faalapotopotoga Tagata Faigaluega Malo Samoa) is a trade union in Samoa. Founded under the New Zealand colonial administration, the union's three-month strike in 1981 was the first major industrial action in Samoan history, and critical to the rise of the Human Rights Protection Party and its victory in the 1982 Western Samoan general election.

The union began as an association of New Zealanders working in the New Zealand colonial administration. Its earliest mention is 1922. In 1960 the union had 600 members, and Tiresa Hunter represented the union at conference of the New Zealand Public Service Association in Wellington. In 1964 the union campaigned for a 10% pay rise, winning 7.5% in 1965.

In 1978 the union was deregistered for failing to file its annual returns. It was revived by younger activists with the assistance of the New Zealand PSA, and re-registered in 1979.

In early 1980 in response to the rising cost of living, the union sought a 30% pay rise for its members. It eventually reached a settlement with the government for a 10% pay rise in June 1980, with another 12% in January 1981. The government broke the agreement in its 1981 budget, presented in December 1980, which provided for only an 8% increase, split into two parts. 4,000 public servants marched on parliament with a petition for an immediate wage increase, which was rejected. The PSA then sent a letter to the Public Service Commission threatening strike action. This was also ignored. On 6 April 1981, the PSA announced an indefinite strike.

The strike crippled Samoan society. Postal and telecommunications services were cut off, public services came to a halt, and emergency services were provided by tiny skeleton staffs, while the loss of public servants' wages caused widespread economic hardship. In May, the government promised a binding commission of inquiry on public service pay, and threatened all the strikers with dismissal unless they returned to work. However, 60% of the public service remained on strike. In June, the government's formal celebrations of 20 years of Samoan independence were truncated, with samoans instead attending a protest march in support of the strike. later in June, the government commission of inquiry reported back, recommending large pay rises, but the strike continued as the government refused to reinstate all the strikers. The strike finally ended in early July, after the government agreed to reinstate all permanent employees. The union won a wage-rise of between 6% and 32% for its members.

The PSA's 1981 strike was called the most divisive issue in Samoan society since the Mau movement for independence. The government's attempts to use Faʻa Sāmoa to break the strike by enlisting matai to pressure strikers caused widespread resentment and division. The strike arguably caused the victory of the HRPP in the 1982 elections.

The union was quiescent from 1981, and allowed its registration to lapse again in 2020. It organised a meeting in the wake of the HRPP's 2021 election loss and the 2021 Samoan constitutional crisis to hear the concerns of public servants around the firing of several chief executives by the new government.
