= O. Vincent Haleck =

American Samoan LDS Church leader (born 1949)

Second Quorum of the Seventy
- April 2, 2011 – October 5, 2019
- Called by: Thomas S. Monson
- End reason: Designated an emeritus general authority

Emeritus General Authority
- October 5, 2019
- Called by: Russell M. Nelson

Personal details
- Born: Otto Vincent Haleck Jr. January 19, 1949 (age 77); Utulei, American Samoa, United States

Otto Vincent Haleck Jr. (born January 19, 1949) has been a general authority of the Church of Jesus Christ of Latter-day Saints (LDS Church) since 2011. He is the first person from American Samoa or Samoa to become a general authority of the LDS Church and is also the first non–New Zealander from the Pacific Islands in this position.

== Early life and biography ==
Haleck was born in Utulei, American Samoa. At the age of 10 he was sent to Seattle, Washington, to live with a relative and attend school. He moved to California to live with other relatives and to attend high school and at the age of 17 he joined the LDS Church. After high school, Haleck became a missionary in the church's Samoa Apia Mission from 1968 to 1970. Haleck received a bachelor's degree in marketing and advertising from Brigham Young University and went on to own a number of businesses in American Samoa, including Tuna Ventures, Inc. and Tropical Beverage Distributors, Inc.

== LDS Church service ==
In the LDS Church, Haleck has served as a bishop, high councilor, stake patriarch, and stake president. He served as president of the Samoa Apia Mission from 2008 to 2011. He was in that capacity when he was called as a general authority and member of the Second Quorum of the Seventy in April 2011. After becoming a general authority, Haleck moved from Pago Pago, American Samoa to Salt Lake City, Utah. From the time of his call to August 2013, he filled assignments at church headquarters. From August 2013 to August 2016, he served as a counselor in the presidency of the church's Pacific Area. In that position, Haleck supervised the church's school system in Kiribati.

Haleck became president of the Pacific Area in 2016 with S. Gifford Nielsen and Craig A. Cardon as counselors. The following year, the LDS Church joined Samoa Council of Churches and Haleck worked with Latter-day Saint Charities to completely renovate their meeting space, including a common area, kitchenette and restroom, for the Fellowship of Women. In 2018, Haleck met with New Zealand Prime Minister Jacinda Ardern and presented her with her family history.

Haleck facilitated the 2019 visit of LDS Church President Russell M. Nelson with His Highness Tuimalealiifano Vaaletoa Sualauvi II of Samoa. A few days later Haleck joined Nelson in meeting with His Majesty King Tupou VI of Tonga.

He was designated as an emeritus general authority in October 2019.

== Personal life ==
In 1972, he married Peggy Ann Cameron in the Provo Utah Temple and they are the parents of three children.
