= Mataiʻa Lynn Netzler =

Samoan businesswoman (1947–2022)

Mataiʻa Lynn Lily Netzler (30 March 1947 - 7 September 2022) was a Samoan businesswoman and entrepreneur.

Mataiʻa was raised by her grandparents in Vailoa, Savaiʻi and educated at Leifiifi Intermediate School and St Mary’s School. She began her business career running a shop in Motoʻotua, and later expanded into running a supermarket, restaurant, bed and breakfast, and rental accommodation. She was a founder of the National Bank of Samoa and later served as chair of its board.

In 2017, she was awarded the Mataiʻa title by the village of Vaitele.

She died on 7 September 2022.
