= Rosalina Richards =

New Zealand behavioural psychologist

Academic background
- Education: University of Otago

Rosalina Richards is a Samoan New Zealand behavioural psychologist. Also known as Rose Richards, she is a full professor at the University of Otago, specialising in Pacific public health.

== Academic career ==
Richards was born and grew up in the South Island of New Zealand, and is of Samoan and English ancestry. She completed a PhD titled Factors influencing physical activity participation during adolescence and young adulthood at the University of Otago, supervised by Anthony Reeder. The thesis was listed as an exceptional PhD thesis in the Division of Health Sciences for 2007. Richards then joined the faculty at Otago, rising to associate professor in 2019 and full professor in 2023.

Richards was the inaugural Director of the Va'a o Tautai – Centre for Pacific Health at Otago, which was launched in 2018. She is also co-director, with Anne-Marie Jackson, of the Coastal People: Southern Skies Centre of Research Excellence, where she is responsible for capacity development and Pacific strategy.

Richards is a behavioural psychologist working in public health, and her research has covered topics such as healthy sleep practices, restoration of marine environments, and their importance in Pacific culture, and cancer prevention. Richards and colleagues surveyed screentime in teenagers, and found that the more hours teens reported watching television or playing games online, the less close their relationship to their parents. She was part of a team who found Pacific communities in New Zealand call the National Poison Centre less often than expected, and part of another team that found rates of Chronic Kidney Disease were five times higher than expected in Samoan people in New Zealand.

== Selected works ==
- Richards, Rosalina; McGee, Rob; Williams, Sheila M.; David Welch; Hancox, Robert (2010). "Adolescent screen time and attachment to parents and peers". JAMA Pediatrics. 164 (3): 258–262. doi:10.1001/archpediatrics.2009.280. PMID 20194259. Wikidata Q43653773.
- Robertson, Lindsay Anne; Hoek, Janet Anne; Mei-Ling Blank; Richards, Rosalina; Pamela Ling; Lucy Popova (2018). "Dual use of electronic nicotine delivery systems (ENDS) and smoked tobacco: a qualitative analysis". Tobacco Control. 28 (1): 13–19. doi:10.1136/tobaccocontrol-2017-054070. PMC 6317506. PMID 29419488. Wikidata Q50118659.
- Gay, Ewa Anna; Richards, Rosalina; Egan, Richard (2011). "Physical activity among cancer survivors: a literature review". The New Zealand Medical Journal. 124 (1337): 77–89. PMID 21946880. Wikidata Q37938654.
- Richards, Rosalina; Williams, Sheila M.; Poulton, Richie Graham; Reeder, Anthony (2007). "Tracking club sport participation from childhood to early adulthood". Research Quarterly for Exercise and Sport. 78 (5): 413–419. doi:10.1080/02701367.2007.10599441. PMID 18274213. Wikidata Q48888410.
- Richards, Rosalina; Darling H; Reeder, Anthony (2005). "Sponsorship and fund-raising in New Zealand schools: implications for health". Australian and New Zealand Journal of Public Health. 29 (4): 331–336. doi:10.1111/j.1467-842x.2005.tb00203.x. PMID 16222930. Wikidata Q46750980.
- Richards, Rosalina; Linda Murdoch; Reeder, Anthony; Marieah Rosenby (2010). "Advocacy for active transport: advocate and city council perspectives". International Journal of Behavioral Nutrition and Physical Activity. 7: 5. doi:10.1186/1479-5868-7-5. PMC 2830166. PMID 20181003. Wikidata Q33694752.
