= The Five Stars =

Samoan pop band

Five Stars
- Origin: Western Samoa
- Genres: Polynesian Music, Pop Music
- Years active: 1974–2006
- Label: Hibiscus
- Past members: Alofa Tu'uga Stevenson; Solomona Tu'uga Stevenson; Uili Tu’uga Stevenson; Sitivi Tu’uga Stevenson; Samu Poulava; Faifua Fa'atoe; Uili Misa

The Five Stars is a family pop band that has recorded many albums of well known and original Samoan and pacific songs. The reference of "Five Stars" in the band's name denotes the five stars on the national flag of Samoa. With more than 18 albums in production, they sit alongside Punialava’a and Tiama’a as some of the Pacific's most well known bands.

== History ==
Formed in 1974 in Auckland, New Zealand, the Five Stars were mainly a family outfit. They consisted of brothers Alofa and Solomona (Soloman) Tu'uga and their relatives Samu Poulava-Selesele, Faifua Fa'atoe and Uili Misa. They were also initially managed by Afoa Tu'uga, who was the father of Alofa and Solomona Tu'uga. They were Hibiscus Records most prolific recording artists and during their career they released nine albums on vinyl LP and compact cassette and received two awards. One was a Gold Discs award and in 1986 the other was a New Zealand Music Award. In the 1990s, most or all of their LP catalogue was released on compact disc.

In April 2006, band leader Alofa Tuuga Stevenson died in Brisbane, Australia.

A current version of the band continues as The Five Star Band with some remaining members and their family members.

== Line up ==
- Samu Poulava-Selesele - (lead vocals)
- Alofa Tu'uga a.k.a. Alofa Tu'uga Stevenson - (lead guitar, died 18 April 2006)
- Uili Misa - (bass guitar)
- Faifua Fa'atoe - (rhythm guitar)
- Solomona Tu'uga a.k.a. Solomona Stevenson - (drums)

=== Other members ===
- Steve Reupena-Stevenson (bass, guitar, drums, percussion, lead/backing vocal).
- Ross Uele
- Sam Poulava-Selesele
- Willie Misa
- Sam Faifua Faatoe (died 30 July 2011)

== Achievements ==
=== Platinum discs ===
- Samoan Style
- Samoa Matalasi

=== Gold discs ===
- Popular Songs of Samoa
- Samoa with love
- Welcome to Samoa
- Pua Samoa
- Live at the Rainmaker Hotel
- Musika Malie
- Children of Polynesia
- Flower of Samoa

== LP Releases ==
- Popular songs of Samoa, Hibiscus records HLS-84 - (1980)
- Fetu e Lima, Hibiscus Records HLS-87 - (1981)

== CD releases ==
=== The Five Stars ===
- Samoan Style (Popular Songs of Samoa), HLS-084, (1990)
- Samoa Matalasi - (My Beautiful Samoa), HLS-087
- Live At The Rainmaker Hotel, HLS-090
- Samoa With Love, HLS-092
- Welcome to Samoa, HLS-094, (1995)
- Musika Malie (Good Music), HLS-097
- Flower of Samoa Matou, HLS-108, (1998)
- The Five Stars Collection Vol 1(Popular Songs of Samoa), HLS-132
- The Five Stars Collection Vol 2, (Popular Songs of Samoa), HLS-158, (1994)
- The Five Stars Collection Vol 3, (Popular Songs of Samoa), HLS-160, (1996)
- Siva Mai, HLS-175, (1998)
- Lalelei pea oe Samoa, HKLS-180

=== Meiona with The Five Stars ===
- I Love You, HLS-143

=== Alofa ===
- Alofa, HLS-199
