= Valerie Saena Tuia =

Samoan biologist

- Education: Bachelor of Agriculture Diploma in Agriculture Masters in Agriculture
- Known for: Root crop research

Valerie Saena Tuia is a plant scientist from Samoa. She served as Officer in Charge of the Genetic Resources at the Secretariat of the Pacific Community Centre for Pacific Crops and Trees for over 15 years, retiring in 2017.

== Life ==
Tuia holds a Bachelor of Agriculture, a postgraduate Diploma in Agriculture and a Masters in Agriculture. In Samoa she held the positions of senior agricultural officer and principal research office in the Samoan civil service. In these roles she was responsible for working with farmers to assist them to diversify and improve their crops. She later moved to Fiji to work at the Secretariat of the Pacific Community Centre for Pacific Crops and Trees as officer in change of genetic resources.

During her tenure, Tuia carried out scientific research into the root crop taro, established the world's largest collection of taro and managed the region's plant genebank. The centre's collection of taro has been used to develop new varieties of taro tolerant to leaf blight disease. Tuia also worked on a system for propagating breadfruit which produced more vigorous and taller plants that those grown using conventional methods.

Following her retirement, Tuia returned to Samoa to run a family business.
