= Ken Kinnersley =

Personal information
- Full name: Kenneth Charles Kinnersley
- Born: 13 March 1914; Apia, Upolu, Samoa
- Died: 30 June 1984 (aged 70); Clifton, Bristol, England
- Batting: Right-handed
- Bowling: Right-arm slow

Domestic team information
- Years: Team
- 1932–1938: Somerset

Career statistics
Competition	FC
Matches	10
Runs scored	143
Batting average	9.53
100s/50s	0/0
Top score	25*
Balls bowled	808
Wickets	17
Bowling average	25.64
5 wickets in innings	0
10 wickets in match	0
Best bowling	3/40
Catches/stumpings	8/–
- Source: CricketArchive, 22 December 2015

Kenneth Charles Kinnersley, born at Apia, Upolu, Samoa on 13 March 1914 and died at Clifton, Bristol on 30 June 1984, played first-class cricket for Somerset in 10 matches in the 1930s. After the Second World War, he played Minor Counties cricket for Devon.

Educated at Clifton College, Kinnersley was a right-handed middle order batsman and a right-arm bowler of slow spinners. A prominent schoolboy cricketer, he made his debut for Somerset in the year he left school, 1932, and though he made little impression with the bat, he took three top-order Indian batsmen's wickets in the first innings of his second match, and two more in the second innings. The 3/40 in the first innings was his best career bowling return. However, after three matches that season, he disappeared from first-class cricket for five years.

In 1937, Kinnersley returned for two matches in which he took eight wickets without improving on his best bowling performance and again had no success as a batsman. In 1938, there were five games, but he bowled only 17 overs in them and, though his batting improved, his highest score was still only 25, which he made twice. In one of these innings, against Sussex at Taunton, Kinnersley's "patient" play gave Somerset a first-innings lead in a rain-ruined match.

After the Second World War, he played successfully as a batsman and occasional bowler for Devon in the Minor Counties Championship, winning his county cap in 1947 and playing until 1955. Against Dorset at Seaton in 1952, he scored 105.
