= Vui Florence Saulo =

American Samoan politician

Vui Florence Tuaumu Saulo is a businesswoman and politician from American Samoa.

Saulo founded her own finance and insurance company and in November 2012 she was elected to the House of Representatives of American Samoa, to represent Tualauta County. She was the only woman in the House, although in 2014 a second woman, Atalina Asifoa, was elected and for two years there were two women in the legislature.

After Saulo's election in 2012 her eligibility to stand was challenged on the grounds that she had allegedly not been required to provide a birth certificate in order to register as a candidate in the election.
