= Le Mamea Matatumua Ata =

One of the framers of the Constitution of Samoa

Le Mamea Matatumua Ata OBE, also known as Le Mamea Mua to differentiate from his uncle Le Mamea Makalau, was one of the framers of the Constitution of Samoa. He held senior positions under the German colonial government of Samoa, New Zealand Trusteeship of Samoa and in the Independent State of Samoa.

He held the high chief (matai) title Le Mamea from Matautu, Lefaga and the orator title Matatumua from Faleasi'u.

For his work, he was appointed an Officer of the Order of the British Empire in the 1960 Queen's Birthday Honours.

He also played the role of Tonga in Return to Paradise a South Seas drama film starring Gary Cooper released by United Artists in 1953. Return to Paradise was filmed on location in Matautu, Lefaga.

== Family ==
Le Mamea Matatumua was the son of Faletoese Lipano a Samoan pastor and educator who was asked by the German Governor Dr. Solf to come to Apia in order to establish the government school at Malifa in 1909. His paternal grandfather was Vaaelua Petaia a Samoan pastor and one of those who helped translate the bible into Samoan.

Le Mamea's uncles Le Mamea Makalau was Minister of the interior in the King Malietoa Laupepa government as well as envoy plenipotentiary to the United States. Another uncle Teo Tuvale was Secretary to Government and Chief Justice.

Le Mamea Matatumua was married to Faalelei Masinalupe with whom he had five children. Following her death in childbirth he latter married Faleluafua with whom he had four children. One of his brothers, Tepa worked for the printing office of the London Missionary Society in Apia and was also responsible for going to the Gilbert Islands (Kiribati) to establish a printing press while his other brother Tuuu Kenape Faletoese was a civil servant in the German and New Zealand administrations before going to Malua to train as a pastor. He later also worked with George Milner on the Samoan Dictionary.

Le Mamea's eldest daughter, Laulu Fetauimalemau Mata'afa was a teacher, member of parliament and ambassador who was married to the paramount chief Fiame Mata'afa Faumuina Mulinu’u II, the first Prime Minister of Samoa. Another daughter Matatumua Maimoana was the first Samoan Superintendent of Nursing, she also became a member of parliament. Both sisters and their brother-in-law Nonumalo Sofara who was married to their sister Eni were founding members of the Human Rights Protection Party (HRPP).

One of his granddaughters, Fiamē Naomi Mataʻafa has served as the prime minister of Samoa since 2021 when she became the first woman elected as prime minister of Samoa. Another, Hinauri Petana was Financial Secretary and is the Samoan High Commissioner to Australia.

== See also ==
- Fa'amatai, chiefly system of Samoa
- Faletoese Lipano Petaia, Father
- Le Mamea Makalau, Uncle
- Teo Tuvale, Uncle
- Walter Vermeulen, Son in law
- Laulu Fetauimalemau Mata'afa, daughter
- Fiame Mata'afa Faumuina Mulinu'u II, son-in-law
- Nonumalo Sofara, son-in-law
- Fiame Naomi Mata'afa, granddaughter
- Hinauri Petana, granddaughter (High Commissioner to Australia)
