= Matatumua Maimoana =

Samoan politician

Matatumua Maimoana (1935–2012), also known as Matatumua Maimoaga Vermeulen, was a matai, politician, Nurse and Environmentalist of Samoa. Her chief title, Matatumua, was an orator's title from the village of Faleasiu. She was a former member of parliament in Samoa and the founder of the Samoa All People's Party (SAPP), becoming the first woman to lead a political party in the country. SAPP allowed people as young as 16, regardless of gender or whether they were matai to be officers in the organisation which included village branches. She was a founding member of the Human Rights Protection Party (HRPP), which has dominated Samoan politics in the last two decades.

Matatumua was a former Superintendent of Nursing who was instrumental in the founding and development of the Samoa School of Nursing. She was an active member of the Samoa Public Service Association (PSA) during the 1981 PSA General Strike which brought down the government of Tupuola Efi. She was involved in environmental issues and is currently a board member of Matuaileo'o Environmental Trust (METI).

== Family ==
Matatumua was the daughter of Le Mamea Matatumua Ata and Faalelei Masinalupe. her paternal grandfather was Faletoese Lipano Petaia a Samoan pastor and educator who established the government school at Malifa during the German colonial administration at the direction of Dr. Solf the German governor.

She was married to Dr. Walter Vermeulen. Her older sister Laulu Fetauimalemau Mata'afa was also a chief and a politician who was the wife of paramount chief Fiame Mata'afa Faumuina Mulinu’u II, the first Prime Minister of Samoa. Another sister Eni was also a founding member of HRPP and the wife of politician Aiono Nonumalo Sofara who left HRPP in 1993 and subsequently formed the Samoa Democratic Party.

== Politics ==
Matatumua founded the Samoa All People's Party (SAPP) on 24 March 1996. Prior to leading the new political party, she had been a founding member of the Human Rights Protection Party (HRPP), first entering parliament as one of the members for the constituency of Aana Number 1 (comprising the villages of Faleasiu and Fasito'o) after the 1982 election. However, later she became known for being a critic of the HRPP government under Tofilau Eti Alesana, often voting against her party and opposing its leader in caucus. Among her criticisms was the extension of the parliamentary term from 3 years to 5 years and the fact that the extension took effect during that sitting of parliament rather than after the subsequent general election. Another major area of contention was the expansion of Cabinet from eight to thirteen members, and the inclusion of under secretaries (deputy ministers), which was seen as depleting the backbench.

In 1990 she introduced a motion for the introduction of universal suffrage while in parliament but was not supported by her own party. After the defeat of the motion, both the HRPP and the coalition under Tupuola Efi and Vaai Kolone promised to introduce universal suffrage if they gained power in the following election. When the HRPP retained power following that election, in which Matatumua lost her seat, the HRPP introduced the bill and Tofilau Eti Alesana claimed credit for the introduction of universal suffrage.

As Deputy Chairperson of the Parliamentary Public Accounts Committee, she often questioned and criticized the government's fiscal policies and practices as well what she saw as its deliberate lack of accountability to parliament. Eventually she resigned from the HRPP and founded SAPP. which has never attained any seats in parliament.

She served as Member of Parliament of the electoral constituency of Aana No.1 from 1982 to 1984, during which she was a member of the Bills Committee, and from 1991 to 1995, during which she was deputy chair of the Public Accounts Committee.

== See also ==
- Fa'amatai, chiefly system of Samoa
- Faletoese Lipano, paternal grandfather
- Le Mamea Makalau, paternal great uncle
- Teo Tuvale, paternal great uncle
- Le Mamea Matatumua Ata, father
- Faalelei Masinalupe, mother
- Walter Vermeulen, husband
- Laulu Fetauimalemau Mata'afa, sister
- Fiame Mata'afa Faumuina Mulinu'u II, brother-in-law
- Nonumalo Sofara, brother-in-law
- Fiame Naomi Mata'afa, niece
- Hinauri Petana, niece (High Commissioner to Australia)
