= Laʻulu Fetauimalemau Mataʻafa =

Samoan politician and diplomat

Laʻulu Fetauimalemau Mata'afa
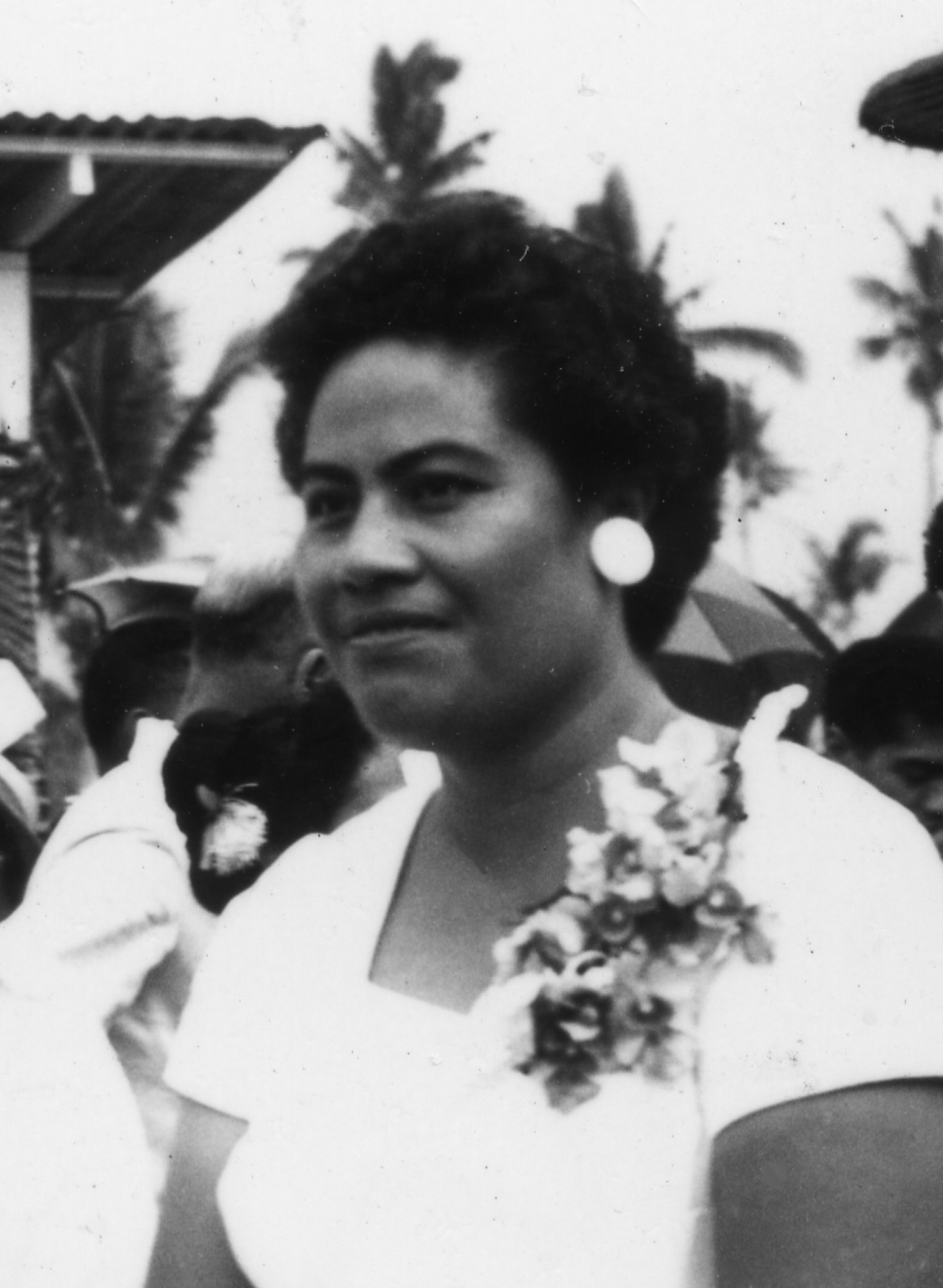
- Mata'afa in 1962

Member of the Samoan Parliament for Lotofaga
- In office 24 February 1979 – 27 February 1982
- Preceded by: Sitagata Liaina
- Succeeded by: Asiasiau Sausoo
- In office 1975 – 21 February 1976
- Preceded by: Fiamē Mataʻafa Faumuina Mulinuʻu II
- Succeeded by: Sitagata Liaina

Personal details
- Born: 23 June 1928 Western Samoa
- Died: 19 November 2007 (aged 79) Samoa
- Resting place: Lotofaga
- Spouse: Fiamē Mataʻafa Faumuina Mulinuʻu II
- Children: Fiamē Naomi Mataʻafa
- Parents: Le Mamea Matatumua Ata (father); Faalelei Masina Lupe (mother)
- Education: Victoria University of Wellington
- Occupation: Diplomat, Chieftain of Samoa

Masiofo Laʻulu Fetauimalemau Mataʻafa, also known as Fetaui Mataʻafa (23 June 1928 – 19 November 2007), was a Samoan politician, chieftain and diplomat who served as a member of parliament for Lotofaga from 1975 to 1976, and again from 1979 to 1982. Mata'afa was later Samoa's first high commissioner to New Zealand. She was also the wife of Samoa's first Prime Minister, Fiame Mata'afa Faumuina Mulinu'u II. Their daughter, Fiamē Naomi Mataʻafa, is a matai high chieftess and former Cabinet Minister, former Deputy Prime Minister, and former Prime Minister of Samoa. The honorific title "Masiofo" is the queenly title for the wife of a paramount chief in Samoa.

== Personal life ==
Fetaui Mata'afa was the eldest daughter of Le Mamea Matatumua Ata OBE, a framer of the Samoan Constitution, and Faalelei Masina Lupe. Her husband, Fiame Mata'afa Faumuina Mulinu'u II, C.B.E., was Samoa's first Prime Minister following independence. She was an educator, community worker, politician, and diplomat. She was recognised internationally for the prominent role she played in enhancing the status of women. As a result of her efforts, she held numerous Government and private sector posts in Samoa, and internationally primarily in the Pacific Region but also worldwide. A long-serving Member of the Samoan Parliament and thereafter as one of her country's most senior diplomats.

== Education ==
Educated at Malifa School in Apia, she left for secondary schooling in New Zealand attending firstly Kōwhai Intermediate School in Auckland and thereafter Wairarapa College in Masterton. Mata'afa then became a student at Victoria University in Wellington, studying for and obtaining a teaching degree from the University's Ardmore Teachers' Training College.

Following graduation, she taught at Boulcott Street Primary School in Lower Hutt, New Zealand (1952) before returning to Samoa and using her knowledge for the benefit of her nation, teaching at the premier secondary school – Samoa College, Vaivase (1953–1961). She left teaching on her marriage to Fiame Mata'afa Faumuina Mulinu’u II, C.B.E.

== Diplomatic and political career ==
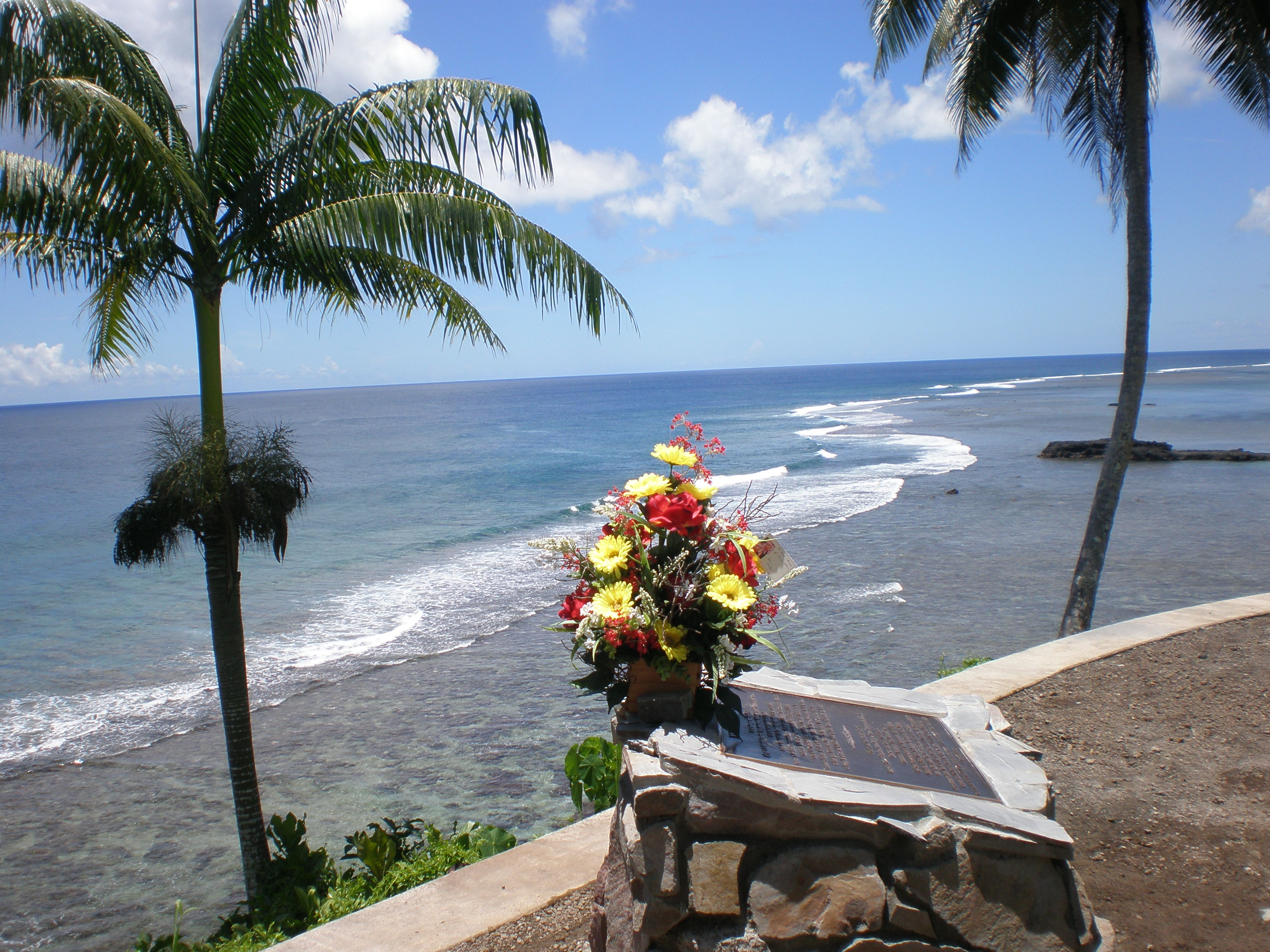
Gravestone of Laulu Fetauimalemau Mata'afa at Lotofaga overlooking the south coast of Upolu island, Samoa

In 1964, she had bestowed upon her the chiefly orator's title "La'ulu" from the village of Lotofaga for which her husband was the then sitting member of parliament.

Her husband's untimely and sudden death came as a great shock, but she was urged to contest his seat using her title "La'ulu" and was successful on her first attempt and entered Parliament in 1975 as the second woman to be elected to the Parliament. She represented the constituency of Lotofaga for two terms. In 1989 she was appointed Consul General to New Zealand by then Prime Minister Tofilau Eti Alesana and promoted to High Commissioner to New Zealand in 1993 before her retirement in 1997. During her diplomatic terms she served as Dean of the Auckland Consular Corps, 1991–1992.

Fetaui Mata'afa was involved in numerous voluntary organisations in Samoa, primarily related to women. From 1960 to 1965, she was President of all Women's Health Committees in the country. She was also President of the Red Cross of Western Samoa from 1964 to 1980 and President of Girls' Brigade from 1980 to 1990. Her longest service was with the Western Samoa National Council of Women as President from 1965–1980 and general secretary from 1981 to 1989 and then as a Permanent Member of the Executive Committee.

A leader of personal presence and magnitude, in addition to her national activities Fetaui Mata'afa was also active in regional and international organisations. In 1970, she was appointed the first Pro-Chancellor of the University of the South Pacific holding this post until 1976. She was a Member of the Commission on World Mission and Evangelism of the World Council of Churches and served as Chairperson of the Pacific Conference of Churches from 1971 to 1976.

She was President of the Pacific Fellowship of Girls' Brigade from 1974 to 1983, and International Secretary of the Pan Pacific and South East Asia Women's Association from 1984 to 1988, becoming a Life member of the Council at Large in 1989. Her activities in North America as a Member of the Nestle Infant Formula Audit Commission (NIFAC) based in Washington D.C., USA. from 1981 to 1991 deserved special recognition for the part she played in children's health and the care of nursing mothers.

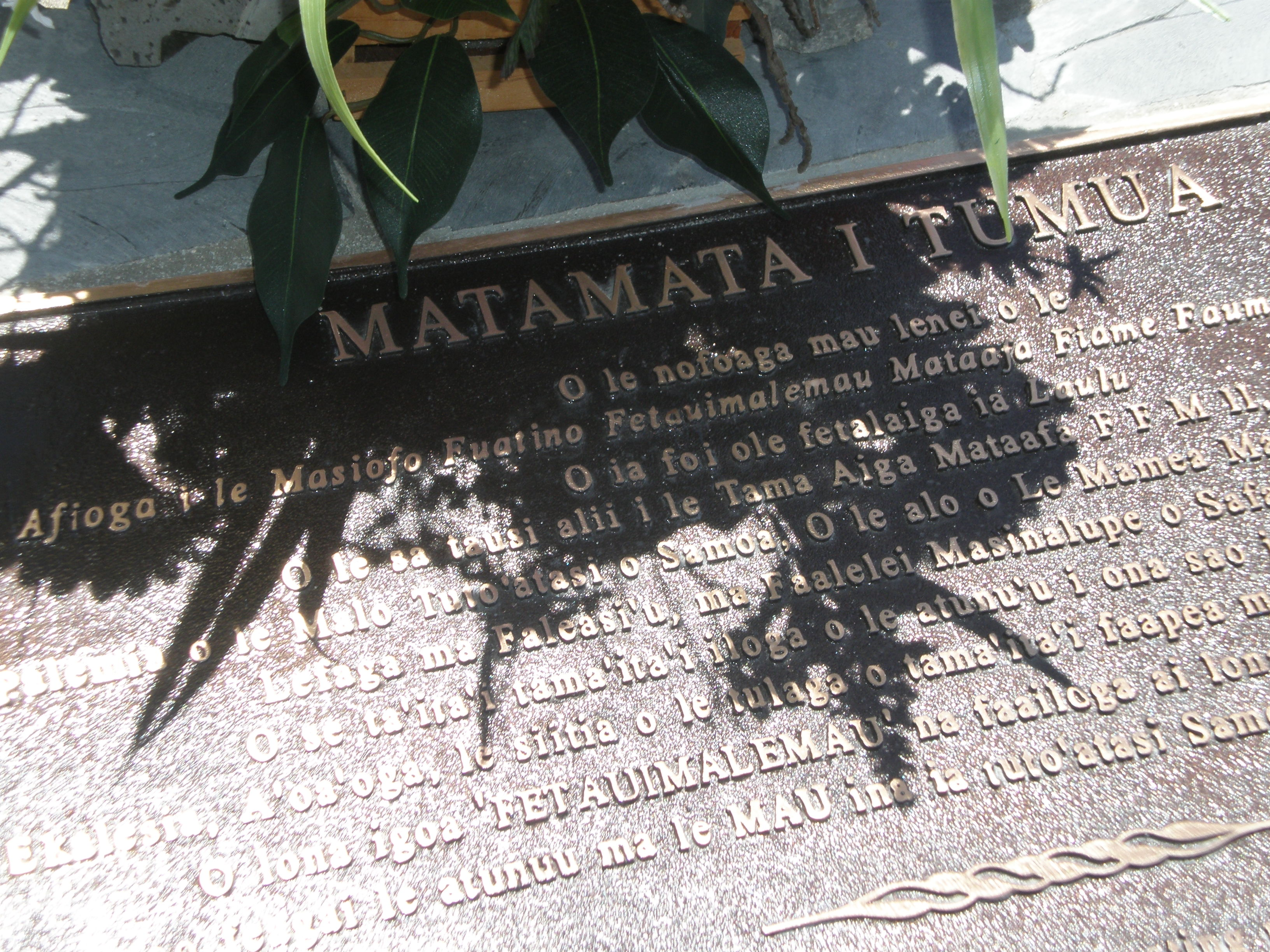
Gravestone inscription in the Samoan language of Laʻulu Fetauimalemau Mata'afa

The awards that followed as recognition of her many and varied roles included an Honorary LL.D from Victoria University, New Zealand in 1976 for outstanding services to education in the Pacific as well as outstanding services on behalf of and for women. Her own nation awarded her the Order of Tiafau in 1993 for her role in the development of Women in Samoa and the Pacific. The University of the South Pacific awarded its first Honorary Doctor of Laws to her in 2004."

== Death ==
On the day of her death she was scheduled to be bestowed with an Honorary Doctorate by the National University of Samoa. She is survived by her only child, Fiamē Naomi Mataʻafa, a multi term minister in government.

== Funeral ==
Her funeral at Lotofaga was attended by government, diplomatic and international representatives including; Samoa's Head of State, Tui Ātua Tupua Tamasese Efi, a delegation from Tonga led by the Queen of Tonga, while among the diplomatic corps present was the Ambassador for China. Her daughter, high chief Fiamē Naomi Mataʻafa gave the eulogy and told how her mother's name Fetauimalemau summed up her mother's character. One meaning was that her mother was born in the time of Samoa's Mau movement ('Fetaui – ma – le – mau' means 'at the time of the Mau') and another meaning was that the word "mau" means a philosophy, belief or cause. Her tomb and gravestone in Lotofaga village overlooks the south coast of Upolu island.

== See also ==
- Mata'afa
- Fa'amatai, chiefly system of Samoa.
- Le Mamea Matatumua Ata, father
- Le Mamea Makalau, granduncle
- Teo Tuvale, granduncle
- Fiame Mata'afa Faumuina Mulinu'u II, husband
- Fiame Naomi Mata'afa, daughter
- Matatumua Maimoana, sister
- Walter Vermeulen, brother-in-law

Legislative Assembly of Samoa
Preceded by Fiamē Mataʻafa Faumuina Mulinuʻu II	Member of Parliament for Lotofaga; 1975–1976	Succeeded by Sitagata Liaina
Preceded by Sitagata Liaina	Member of Parliament for Lotofaga; 1979–1982	Succeeded by Asiasiau Sausoo
