= Autagavaia Tipi Autagavaia =

Samoan journalist

- Occupations: Journalist, Correspondent

Autagavaia Tipi Autagavaia is a journalist, the Samoan representative of Radio Polynesia and reporter and correspondent for Radio New Zealand International. He was a reporter for Televise Samoa from 1993 to May 1995 and is also a former president of the Journalists Association of (Western) Samoa (JAWS).

== World Press Freedom Day ==
At the World Press Freedom Day ceremonies at Hotel Kitano Tusitala, Autagavaia told of how in recent years, the major changes that had taken place in Samoa. He commented that in the Pacific Islands, that Samoa’s news media is among the most free.

Autagavaia and Samoa Observer editor-in-chief Savea Sano Malifa in appeals to the government to remove restrictions, they urged Prime Minister Tuilaepa Aiono Sailele Malielegaoi and Deputy Prime Minister Misa Telefoni to remove the Printing and Publishing Act, to try to force news media to reveal their sources of information and remove the criminal libel laws. Autagavaia described these as a relic of the past. He also urged them to encourage the TV and radio services that were government owned to be more accessible to all viewpoints. He said NESCO.orgsenior state-run radio media shouldn't be frightened to put all viewpoints and news on air.

== Banned from reporting ==
In 2007 Tipi Autagavaia and another reporter told by Maposua Rudolf Keil, the owner of Samoa Radio Polynesia to stop attending SDUP’s news conferences. This was to do with a news conference that raised allegations of corruption against the government. Station owner Maposua Keil also banned further coverage of corruption stories by the SDUP leader. Shocked by the decision Autagavaia said that he still had a job to do. Station owner Keil, aka Maposua Rudolf Keil said that instead the two reporters should praise the government for its good work.
