= Palanitina Tupuimatagi Toelupe =

Samoan nurse, educator and public service administrator

Palanitina Tupuimatagi Toelupe COS

Personal details
- Born: Faletagaloa Safune, Vailele, Vailoa
- Education: National University of Samoa University of New South Wales University of New England
- Profession: Health governance and public health education

Palanitina Tupuimatagi Toelupe is a Samoan public service leader and the first woman to be the Director General and Chief executive officer of the Ministry of Health in Samoa. She has been active in the health sector for almost half century as an educator, nurse and later in senior positions across different boards. In 2023, she was made a companion of the Order of Samoa in the 2023 Samoa Honours and Awards.

== Life ==
Palanitina was educated at Samoa College in Samoa, graduating in 1974 and later receiving a scholarship to study in New Zealand at the Rotorua Public Hospital School of Nursing, where she remained from 1975 to 1978. She became a registered nurse in 1979 and served at the Tupua Tamasese Meaole Hospital at Motootua till 1998. In 2005, Palanitina was appointed Chief executive officer for the Ministry of Health where she remained until 2014 and later headed the National Health Services of Samoa from 2016 to 2019. She was the Chairperson of the Samoa Qualifications Authority and is a member of the Land Transport Authority.

Palanitina has been involved in the inclusion of women and their roles in Samoan villages by working with the Samoa National Council of Women. In 2020, she helped to organise a workshop, wanting women to reclaim their healthcare roles at the village level and;

"...to revive that strength in order for women to realise they are the powerhouse [of their village,]”

In 2023, Palanitina helped create the first ever talanoa, a Samoan form of dialogue that brings people together to share opposing views without any predetermined expectations for agreement, on zero tolerance for violence in the family in the village of Taga. Palanitina supported the Samoa National Council of Women workshop by promoting encouragement and confidence in Samoan women to talk about and reduce violence against women.

Palanitina is currently the General Manager of the National Health Services of Samoa.
