= Afemata Tunumafono Apelu Aiavao =

Samoan journalist and educator (1931–2021)

Tunumafono Apelu Aiavao (1931 — 3 June 2021) was a Samoan journalist, editor, writer, and educator. He was editor of the government-owned Savali newspaper from 1979 to 2000 and the Congregational Christian Church of Samoa run Sulu Samoa from 2007 — 2018, and authored several volumes of short stories.

Aiavao was from Sataoa and was educated at Samoa College. In 1953 he was the first Samoan to pass the New Zealand School Certificate examination. He later studied in New Zealand, where he obtained a Teacher's Certificate, and returned to Samoa to become a teacher. After teaching at Samoa College, where he edited the school's first publication, he became principal of Palauli Primary School. He subsequently worked as government Chief Information Officer and editor of the government-owned Savali newspaper from 1979 to 2000. After retiring from that position he edited the Congregational Christian Church Samoa's Sulu Samoa from 2007, finally retiring in 2018. He was awarded the Head of State's Service Medal in the 2017 Samoa Honours and Awards.

Aiavao published several volumes of short stories, some of which were adapted for radio broadcast.

Aiavao died in June 2021 and received a state funeral.

== Works ==
- E vaetulī le fale Sāmoa 'a 'o le fa'asinomaga : afemata tunumafono (2004)
- O tala faafagogo tautaua a le lalolagi (1996)
- Maunu mai loimata o 'Apa'ula (1987)
