= 2023 Samoa Honours and Awards =

The 2023 Samoa Honours and Awards were appointments made by the O le Ao o le Malo of Samoa, Tuimalealiʻifano Vaʻaletoʻa Sualauvi II, to various Orders, decorations, and medals of Samoa under the Honours and Awards Act 1999. The awards were announced on 31 May 2023. This was the first awards ceremony held since the 2017 Samoa Honours and Awards.

The recipients of honours are displayed here as they were styled before their new honour.

== Order of Merit of Samoa (OM) ==
- Tui Ātua Tupua Tamasese Efi
- Brother Kevin O’Malley
- Senara Tautiga
- Tupu Folasa II
- Emanuela Betham
- Luaipou Sally Betham
- Sapa’u Lilomaiava Lolesio Vitale
- Solialofi Tuuaimalo Pisimala
- Tuaopepe Jerry Wallwork

== Order of Samoa ==
=== Companions ===
- Tuatagaloa Asi Blakelock
- Gatoloai Tili Afamasaga
- Palanitina Tupuimatagi Toelupe
- Tuatagaloa Folasaitu Joe Annandale
- Tusani Iosefatu Reti Tusani

=== Officers ===
- Asuao Tali Williams
