= Rex Maughan =

American businessman (born 1936)

Rex G. Maughan
- Born: November 20, 1936; Logan, Utah, U.S.
- Died: July 17, 2021 (aged 84)
- Occupations: Founder, President, and CEO of Forever Living Products
- Spouse: Ruth

Rex Maughan was an American businessman. He was the founder, president, and chief executive officer of Forever Living Products, superseded by his son Gregg Maughan in the position of CEO. Forever Living is a multi-level marketing company that sells aloe vera and bee hive-based cosmetics and other personal products.

== Early life ==
Maughan was born November 20, 1936, in Logan, Utah. He grew up on a ranch in Soda Springs, Idaho. He is a member of the Church of Jesus Christ of Latter-day Saints, and served an LDS mission in Samoa. Rex met and married his wife Ruth while they were both attending Brigham Young University (BYU). When Ruth graduated from BYU with a degree in elementary education, she and Rex moved to Arizona. Ruth taught school while Rex finished his degree at Arizona State University, eventually earning his B.S. in accounting in 1962.

== Career ==
Maughan began investing in land while still working as an accountant in the early 1960s. Later, he joined the Del E. Webb Construction Company, and spent the next 13 years there, reaching the position of vice president. Maughan was also adding to his own real estate and ranching investments at this time.

=== Forever Living Products ===
Maughan founded Forever Living Products in 1978. The company initially made lotions from the aloe vera plant. The product line has grown and diversified, now encompassing a broad range of other products which are marketed through a multi-level marketing system. Since aloe vera is still a key ingredient in many of Forever Living products, Maughan segued into aloe cultivation and processing.

Maughan expanded into the resort business in 1981, under the umbrella of a sister company, Forever Resorts.

In 2002 Maughan was listed in the Forbes 400 as the 368th-richest man in the USA, with a net worth of $600 million. but he was not on the list before and after 2002 it look suspicious there claims regarding worth.

=== Legal issues ===
In 1996, upon suggestion of the American authorities, the Internal Revenue Service (IRS) and the National Tax Agency of Japan (NTA) initiated a joint audit of Rex and Ruth Maughan and related entities Aloe Vera of America (AVA), Selective Art Inc., FLP International, and FLP Japan for the period of 1991 to 1995. In 1997, the NTA imposed a penalty tax of ¥3.5 billion on Forever Living's Japan division for concealing income of 7.7 billion yen over the five-year period. Later that year, AVA, Rex and Ruth Maughan, Maughan Holdings, Gene Yamagata, and Yamagata Holdings sued the IRS for unauthorized disclosure of tax return information. In the midst of the lawsuit, The IRS asked the NTA to drop its decision against Forever Living, and in 2002, the agency "grudgingly complied with the IRS's request", announcing that the penalty tax had been effectively withdrawn. In February 2015, a USA district court ruled that the IRS knowingly provided some false information about AVA to the NTA, in violation of the United States' tax treaty with Japan. and awarded three of the plaintiffs one thousand dollars each in statutory damages.

In 2002, the Arizona Supreme Court reversed the findings of lower courts in a case in which Rex Maughan was accused of terminating an employee because the employee refused to sell a piece of land to Maughan.

== Personal life ==
Maughan and his wife have three children and 12 grandchildren.

=== Activism ===
In Vailima, Samoa, Maughan has contributed to the preservation of author Robert Louis Stevenson's estate, making it into a museum. In early 2005 Maughan accompanied a BYU Television team to American Samoa to coordinate installation of a satellite receiver he had donated.

Maughan has financially supported various political campaigns, including Mitt Romney's 2008 and 2012 bids for the U.S. Presidency.

=== Recognition ===
Maughan was made an honorary member of the Order of Merit of Samoa in the 2014 Samoa Honours and Awards. .
