= Fay Calkins =

American academic and writer

Fay Gilkey Calkins Ala'ilima (24 September 1921 - 1 August 2010) was an American academic and writer who lived in Samoa. She was the wife of Samoan politician Leiataualesa Vaiao Alailima.

== Life and career ==
Calkins was born in Auburn, New York and educated at Oberlin College, Ohio, and Haverford College, Pennsylvania. She then worked for the United Nations Relief and Rehabilitation Administration assisting the survivors of Nazi concentration camps. Later she worked as an organiser for the Textile Workers Union of America before completing a PhD at the University of Chicago. Her thesis was on The CIO and the Democratic Party, and was later published as her first book in 1952. She married Leiataualesa Vaiao Alailima in 1952 while studying in Washington, D.C., and moved with him to what was then Western Samoa. Their early life together is chronicled in her second book, My Samoan Chief.

In Samoa she taught at Pesega College and Samoa College. Following Leiataualesa's retirement as public service commissioner, they moved to Hawaii, where they worked for the East–West Center. She also taught at Kamehameha Schools, Hawaii Loa College, and Leeward Community College. In 1986, they returned to Samoa, where she worked as her husband's secretary while he served as a government minister. She later worked for the National University of Samoa's Institute of Samoan Studies. In 1995 she received a grant under the Fulbright Program for work on Samoan politics, which later became her unpublished book, Samoa's Changing Chiefdom. After retiring from the NUS, she returned to Hawaii. She died on 1 August 2010.

== Works ==
- The CIO and the Democratic Party (University of Chicago Press, 1952)
- My Samoan Chief (Doubleday, 1962)
- Aggie Grey : a Samoan saga (Mutual Publishing, 1988)
