= Maposua =

Maposua is both a surname and a given name. Notable people with the name include:

- Uati Maposua (born 1976), Samoan weightlifter
- Maposua Rudolf Keil (died 2018), Samoan businessman
