= 2014 Samoa Honours and Awards =

The 2014 Samoa Honours and Awards were appointments made by the O le Ao o le Malo of Samoa, Tui Atua Tupua Tamasese Efi, to various Orders, decorations, and medals of Samoa under the Honours and Awards Act 1999. The investiture ceremony was held on 22 December 2014.

The recipients of honours are displayed here as they were styled before their new honour.

== Order of Merit of Samoa (OM) ==
=== Honorary members (noncitizens) ===
- Papali’i Chellaraj Satvadas Benjamin
- Taffy Gould
- Tilafaiga Rex Maughan

=== Members ===
- Alistair Leighton Hutchinson (Honorary)
- Walter Vermeulen (Honorary)
- Seiuli Paul Wallwork
- Savea Sano Malifa
- Muliagatele Brian Pala Lima OS
- Adimaimalaga Tafuna’i

== Order of Samoa ==
=== Companions ===
- Tupua Friedrich Wilhelm Wetzell
- Leali’ie’e Rudolf Henry Ott

=== Members ===
- Magi Herman Westerlund

== Head of State's Service Order ==
- Pelenatete Stowers
- Aumua Mata’itusi Simanu
- Te’o Eteuati Uelese Sagala
- Su’a Frieda Margaret Keil–Paul

== Head of State's Service Medal ==
- Margaret Chalichery OS
- Fe’esago Siaosi Fepulea’i
- A’eau Taulupo'o Lafaiali’i
- Lei’ataua Punivalu
- Moti Satuala Tua’iaufa’i Amosa
- Vala Uale Ma’i
