= Laura Foreman =

Laura Foreman may refer to:

- Laura Foreman (dancer)
- Laura Foreman (journalist)
