= Wallwork =

Wallwork is a surname. Notable people with the surname include:

- Elizabeth Wallwork (1883–1969), English born, New Zealand painter
- James Wallwork (born 1930), American politician
- Jenny Wallwork (born 1987), English badminton player
- Jeremiah Wallwork, Samoan weightlifter and sports official
- Jim Wallwork (1919–2013), British World War II pilot
- John Wallwork (aviator) (1898–1922), English World War I flying ace
- John Wallwark (born 1946), English surgeon
- Paul Wallwork (1942–2024), Samoan weightlifter, civil servant and sports administrator
- Ron Wallwork (born 1941), English racewalker
- Ronnie Wallwork (born 1977), English footballer
