= Leiataualesa Vaiao Alailima =

Samoan politician

Leiataualesa Vaiao Ala'ilima

Member of the Samoa Parliament for Aiga-i-le-Tai
- In office 26 February 1988 – 26 April 1996
- Preceded by: Sa'u Lo'ivao
- Succeeded by: Togia Taloa

Personal details
- Born: 29 November 1921 Gataivai, Samoa
- Died: 27 November 2016 (aged 94) Pago Pago, American Samoa

Leiataualesa Vaiao John Ala'ilima (29 November 1921 – 27 November 2016) was a Samoan politician and Cabinet Minister. He was the husband of writer Fay Calkins.

Leiataualesa was born in Gataivai, Samoa and educated at Lahainaluna High School in Hawaii. He served in the United States Marine Corps. He later attended McPherson College in Kansas, and American University in Washington, D.C., where he completed an M.A. thesis on Democracy: Samoan Style. He married writer Fay Calkins while studying in Washington. Their early life together is chronicled in her book, My Samoan Chief.

Leiataualesa initially ran a banana plantation, but when Samoa gained independence in 1962 he became the country's first Public Service Commissioner. He took a leave of absence in 1964 to contest the 1964 Western Samoan general election, but was unsuccessful. In February 1964 he suspended the Government Printer, Frank Sprague, for regularly being found in the Apia Club during work hours. Sprague was subsequently dismissed during Leiataualesa's leave of absence, challenged his dismissal in court, and had it overturned. Leiataualesa initially ignored the court ruling, but paid Sprague up until the end of his contract after Cabinet instructed him to obey it. Later in 1964 he was instructed by Cabinet to implement a new policy to dismiss any public servant who had deliberately deceived a government department. The policy was intended to target harbourmaster Captain Harry Moors, who had been critical of government policy, but Leiataualesa pointed out that he had not been convicted of deceiving a government department, and instead dismissed eleven senior public servants, many of whom were allies of the government. Leiataualesa contract as Public Service Commissioner was not renewed, and he was replaced by Tufuga Samuelu Atoa in 1965. Leiataualesa subsequently moved to Hawaii, where he was a research fellow at the East–West Center.

He returned to Samoa in 1986, and was elected to the legislative Assembly of Samoa in the 1988 election. he served as Minister of Justice, Labour, Public Service, and Public Works before retiring from politics in 1996.

Following his retirement from politics Leiataualesa worked as a research fellow at the National University of Samoa in the Samoan Studies program. He published a book of oral histories and genealogies, O tatou Tupuaga: Our Ancestors.
