= Emanuela Betham =

Samoan nun and schoolteacher

Emanuela Betham (born 1934 or 1935) is a Samoa nun and schoolteacher.

Betham is from the villages of Leagiagi and Leone and was educated at Saleaumua Primary School. She joined the Missionary Sisters of the Society of Mary at the age of 19. In 1973, she was one of the first Samoans to graduate from the University of the South Pacific. She was principal of St Marys College at Vaimoso from 1970 to 1981, 1987 to 1997, and again in 2001. After working in Rome, she taught at Moamoa Theological College.

In 2017 she was one of the Samoa Observer's people of the year. In 2018 she marked 60 years of service to her church.

She was awarded the Order of Merit of Samoa in the 2023 Samoa Honours and Awards.
