= Gatoloai =

Gatoloai is a given name. Notable people with the given name include:

- Gatoloai Tili Afamasaga (born 1947), Samoan educator
- Gatoloai Peseta Sio (1910–1990), Western Samoan chief
