= Afamasaga =

Afamasaga is both a given name and a surname. Notable people with the name include:

- Afamasaga Rico Tupai (born 1969), Samoan politician
- Failaga Afamasaga (born 1989), Samoan rugby union player
- Gatoloai Tili Afamasaga (born 1947), Samoan educator
- Jack Afamasaga (born 1984), New Zealand rugby player
