= Jeremiah Wallwork =

Samoan weightlifter (born 1972)

Personal information
- Nationality: Samoan
- Born: 29 August 1972 (age 54)

Sport
- Sport: Weightlifting

Tuaopepe Asiata Jerry Wallwork (born 29 August 1972) is a Samoan weightlifter and sports official who represented Samoa in weightlifting at the 1992 Summer Olympics. He is the son of weightlifter Paul Wallwork and the brother of Attorney-General Su'a Hellene Wallwork. In June 2017 he was appointed to the board of the International Weightlifting Federation.

In December 2022 the Samoa Observer named Tuaopepe one of its people of the year.

He was awarded the Order of Merit of Samoa in the 2023 Samoa Honours and Awards.

In April 2025 he was elected president of the Samoa Association of Sports and National Olympic Committee. In May 2025 he was elected to the International Weightlifting Federation Executive Board. In July 2026 he was elected president of the Commonwealth Weightlifting Federation.
