= Sapa'u Lolesio =

Samoan politician (1927–2026)

Member of the Samoa Parliament for Sagaga-le-Falefa
- In office 26 February 1988 – 5 April 1991
- Preceded by: Aiono Nonumalo Sofara
- Succeeded by: Aiono Nonumalo Sofara

Personal details
- Born: 8 June 1927 Samoa
- Died: 23 September 2026 (aged 99) Saleimoa, Samoa

Sapa'u Lilomaiava Lolesio Vitale OM (8 June 1927 – 23 September 2026) was a Samoan politician who represented the constituency of Sagaga-le-Falefa from 1988 to 1991.

== Life and career ==
Sapa'u was born on 8 June 1927, and came from the village of Levī Saleimoa. He worked as a police officer from 1953 to 1987, before being elected to the Legislative Assembly of Samoa at the 1988 Western Samoan general election. He lost his seat at the 1991 election.

In the 2023 Samoa Honours and Awards he was made a member of the Order of Merit of Samoa.

Sapa'u died at his home in Saleimoa, on 23 September 2026, at the age of 99.
