= Adimaimalaga Tafunaʻi =

Samoan social entrepreneur

- Occupation: Entrepreneur
- Known for: President of the Women in Business Development Inc (WIBDI), Samoa.

Adimaimalaga Tafunaʻi is a Samoan entrepreneur who, together with others in Samoa, established Women in Business Development Inc (WIBDI). Under her leadership as executive director, WIBDI has had many achievements, including negotiating with The Body Shop to supply of organic virgin coconut oil. Tafunaʻi has received numerous awards and also collaborates with the World Economic Forum.

== Career ==
Women in Business Development Inc was established in 1991, initially as a way of encouraging Samoan women to go into business. However, after several natural disasters affecting Samoa, Tafunaʻi and her colleagues changed their focus to concentrate on village-based economic development. In 1995, she led efforts to revive Samoa's fine mat weaving, transforming this into an income-generating activity, whereas in the past such mats had been used mainly within the family. In 2005, she helped to found the Pacific Organic and Ethical Trade Community (POETCom). This led to an appreciation of the marketing possibilities for organic products from Samoa, and the signing in 2008 of the contract with The Body Shop to sell organically certified virgin coconut oil. Between 2005 and 2008 she was chair of the Pacific Islands Association of Non-Governmental Organisations (PIANGO). In 2008, she was asked to be a member of the Commonwealth Observer Group observing the Presidential and Parliamentary Elections in Uganda.

Tafunaʻi has concentrated on connecting Samoan women to global markets, enabling them to use the natural products in their villages. WIBDI now works with 150 women's groups throughout Samoa, with the coconut oil supplied to The Body Shop being produced by hundreds of families. Tafunaʻi has also encouraged the production of Noni juice, organic bananas, woven mats, and tapa cloth. She has also worked to involve other Pacific countries as suppliers. Although Tafunaʻi promotes indigenous traditions, she is also very technologically aware, and WIBDI has introduced mobile apps for agricultural extension, crop production and agricultural marketing and even uses drones to assess farmers' fields.

Tafunaʻi sits on the Global Agenda Council for New Growth Models for the World Economic Forum. She also serves as an Emerging Pacific Women Leaders Project mentor.

== Recognition ==
- The International Award at the 2015 Diller-von Furstenberg Awards. Tafunaʻi received the award at the United Nations in New York City in an event co-hosted by Diane von Furstenberg and Tina Brown, with the participation of Hillary Clinton, Gloria Steinem and Naomi Campbell, among others.
- She was appointed to the Order of Merit of Samoa in the 2014 Samoa Honours and Awards.
- A Global Leadership Award for Economic Empowerment from Vital Voices in 2012.
- New Zealand Prime Minister's Fellowship Award, 2008.
