= Old Thong Chai Medical Institution =

Old Thong Chai Medical Institution 舊同濟醫院
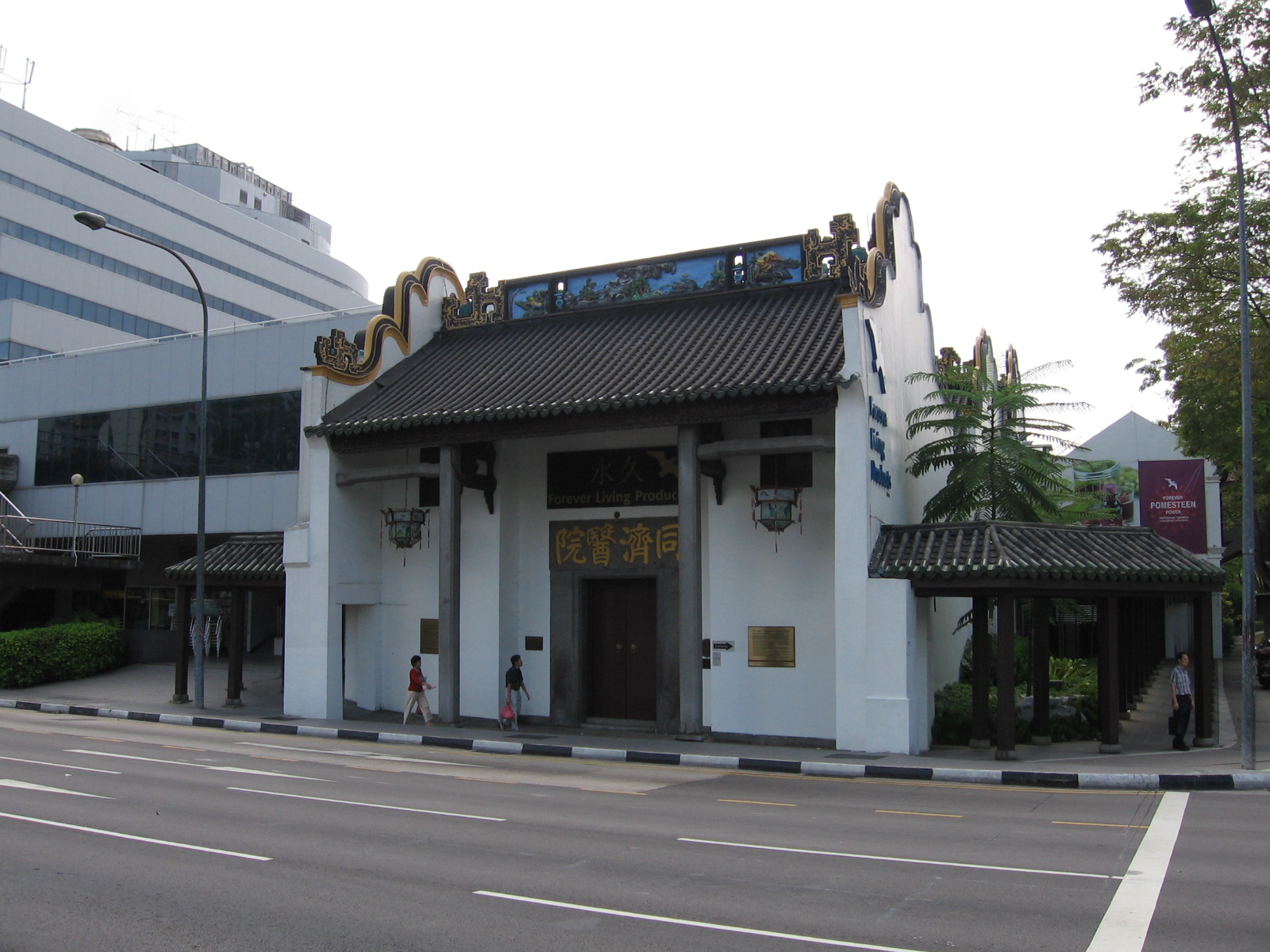
- Old Thong Chai Medical Institution in 2006

- Location within Singapore
- Interactive map of Old Thong Chai Medical Institution 舊同濟醫院
- 1°17′14.3″N 103°50′44″E
- Location: 50 Eu Tong Sen Street, Singapore 059803

History
- Built: 1892; 134 years ago

Site notes
- Governing body: National Heritage Board

National monument of Singapore
- Designated: 6 July 1973; 53 years ago
- Reference no.: 1

The Old Thong Chai Medical Institution (Chinese: 舊同濟醫院) is a historic building in Singapore, and is located at Eu Tong Sen Street in the Singapore River Planning Area, within the Central Area, Singapore's central business district.

The building was constructed in 1892, and housed one of the best known Chinese charity medical centres in Singapore. Traditional Chinese doctors or sinsehs used to dispense free treatment and medicine to patients of all races in Singapore. Today, it is used as a commercial building for the Singapore office for Forever Living Products.

The current Thong Chai Medical Institution was located in Thong Chai Building, 50 Chin Swee Road.

== History ==
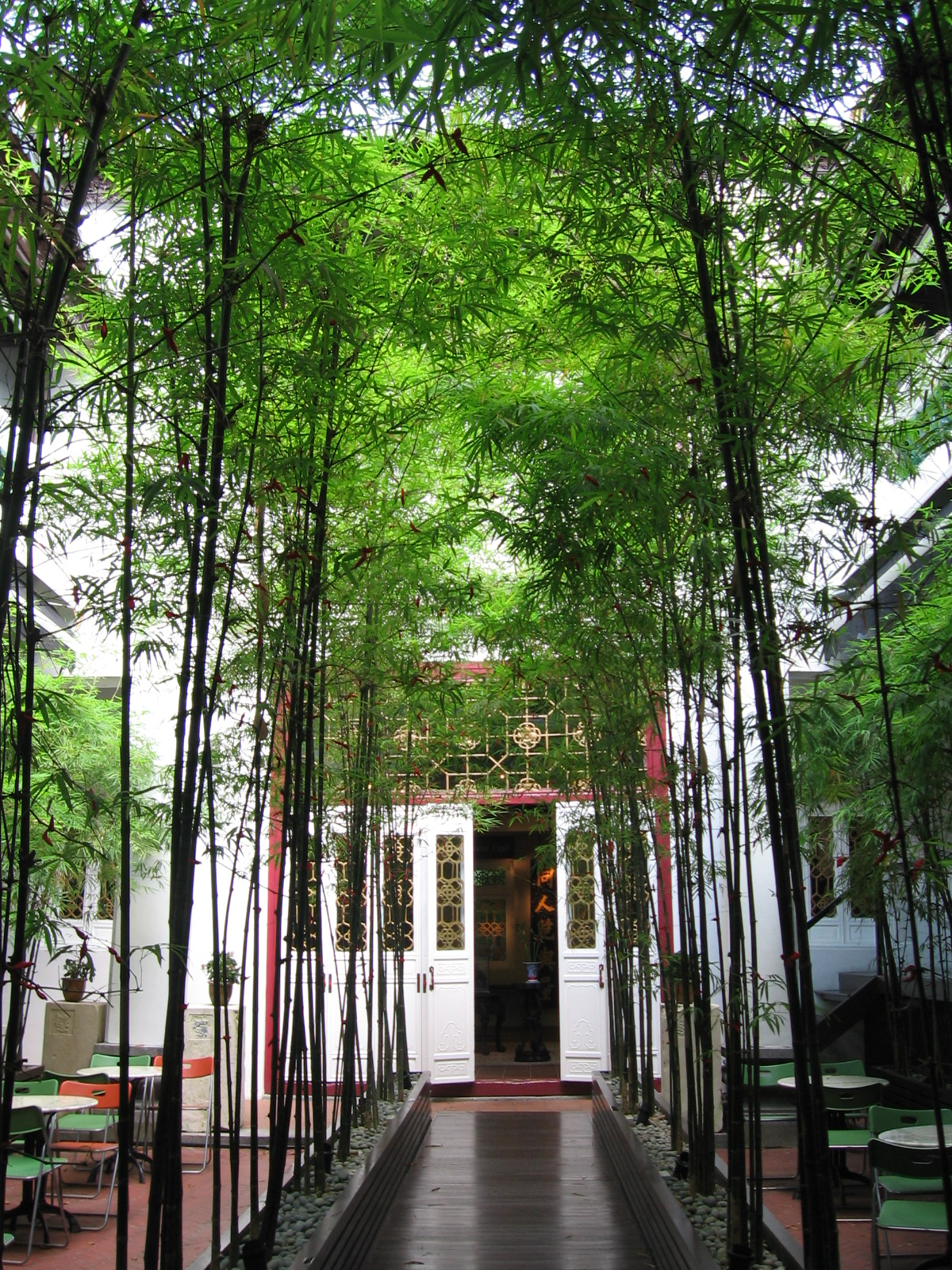
Today, the Old Thong Chai Medical Institution building is used as a retail shop for a healthcare company which is Forever Living Products.

In 1867, two Chinese merchants got together to set up Singapore's first traditional Chinese medical institution for the poor. These compassionate men saw an urgent need for a charitable organisation that provided medical advice and assistance to those who could not afford to pay for it.

The Old Thong Chai Medical Institution was gazetted as a national monument on 6 July 1973.

== Commercial history ==
The late 1990s saw the building first becoming a nightclub and later a number of restaurants. In 2000, the building was acquired by Tung Lok Group and the building became a restaurant known as Jing. Not long after its opening, the group revamped its concept and named it Asian. Both restaurants proved to be unpopular, and it closed down in 2003 due to SARS outbreak. The building was unused for around two years and it was converted into its current use in 2005.

The building is currently owned by Forever Living Products Intl, a multi-level marketing company selling aloe vera products. The company bought the building from the government in 2005 for S$7 million. The furnishing and such cost the company an additional $3 million as they imported the antique furnitures from Malaysia and China.
