= Savea Sano Malifa =

Samoan journalist

Savea Sano Malifa OM (also known as Fata Sano Malifa) is a Samoan poet, journalist, newspaper editor, and publisher. He is the founder and editor-in-chief of the Samoa Observer, the main newspaper in Samoa. The Pacific Islands News Association awarded him the Pacific Freedom of Information award for defending the right of the Samoan people to freedom of information and expression. In 1998, he received the Commonwealth Press Union's Astor Award and Index on Censorship's Press Freedom Award.

Savea, an outspoken critic of former Prime Minister Tofilau Eti Alesana and his government, lost a civil claim over a story alleging the use of public funds to upgrade a hotel owned by Tofilau's children for a visit by Prince Edward, Earl of Wessex. The Samoa Observer was ordered to pay $WS 75,000 in court costs to Tofilau and $50,000 in damages for defamation.

Savea was born in Afega and educated at Samoa College. After studying mechanical engineering at Wellington Polytechnic in New Zealand, he worked at General Motors New Zealand, the Government Printing Office, and the advertising department of The Evening Post, before becoming a writer. Inspired by poet James K. Baxter, he travlled to Jerusalem, New Zealand to visit him, then wrote poetry while working on a farm in Rotorua. He returned briefly to Samoa in 1974, then travelled to America, where he travelled for three years.

On returning to Samoa he worked as a reporter for the Samoa Times, but quit following an editorial dispute over a story on the April 1978 Apia Cessna crash. He then founded the Samoa Observer, producing the initial copies on a manual typewriter on a friend's kitchen table.

He published his first book of poetry, Looking Down at Waves, in 1975. He is also the author of the novel Alms for Oblivion.

During the 2004 World Press Freedom Day awards, along with veteran reporter Autagavaia Tipi Autagavaia, Malifa made appeals to the government to remove restrictions; they urged Prime Minister Tuilaepa Aiono Sailele Malielegaoi and Deputy Prime Minister Misa Telefoni to remove the Printing and Publishing Act, to try to force news media to reveal their sources of information and remove the criminal libel laws, which Autagavaia had described as a relic of the past.

== Recognition ==
In 2000, Malifa was named as one of the International Press Institute's 50 World Press Freedom Heroes of the past 50 years.

Malifa was appointed to the Order of Merit of Samoa in the 2014 Samoa Honours and Awards.
