= Forever Living Products =

American multi-level marketing company

Forever Living Products International, Inc.
- Type: Privately held company
- Industry: Multi-level marketing
- Founded: 1978
- Founder: Rex Maughan
- Headquarters: Arizona, United States
- Products: Aloe vera- and bee-based products
- Revenue: $4bn (2022)
- Number of employees: 4100 (2006)
- Subsidiaries: Aloe Vera of America, Forever Aloe Plantations, Forever Nutraceutical
- Website: foreverliving.com

Forever Living Products is a controversial multi-level marketing company which was founded in 1978 in Tempe, Arizona by Rex Maughan. The company has reported a network of 9.3 million distributors and revenue of $4 billion in 2021, and in 2006 they reported having 4,100 employees.

== History ==
Forever Living was founded in 1978 in Tempe, Arizona by Rex Maughan. By the 1990s, Rex Maughan had purchased the Texas company Aloe Vera of America, with Aloe Vera of America selling its products to Forever Living for distribution. Some journalists have likened the multi-level marketing business model of Forever Living's distribution system to that of a pyramid scheme.

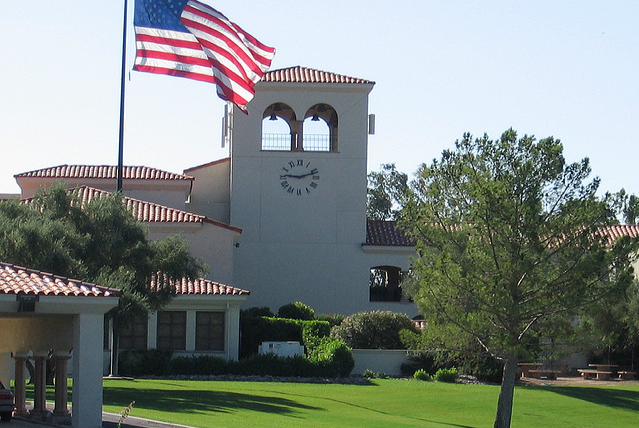
Forever Living Products headquarters in McCormick Ranch in Arizona in 2007. The company's resort division owned several similar properties.

In 1983, the company was named No. 6 on Inc. Magazine's annual Inc. 500 list of the fastest-growing private companies in the United States.

According to Arthur Andersen's Top 100, as of 1993, Forever Living Products International was Arizona's second-largest private company. As of August 1995, Forbes reported the company's product line included "deodorants, toothpaste, laundry detergent and three dozen other products, nearly all of which contain extract of aloe."

A three-part special report by the Manila Times in 2003 discussed similarities between FLPI's business model and an illegal pyramid scheme, noting that FLPI participants are said to be rewarded primarily for recruiting new members to the organization, rather than for selling products to genuine end-users.

Forever Living reported unaudited annual revenue exceeding $1.15 billion in 2005 and ended the year with around 150,000 distributors and 55 employees. The following year, Forever Living was listed at No. 340 on the Forbes 400 list, which ranks the largest private companies in the United States. At the time, the company was described as having 4,100 employees and sold its product in 100 countries.

In 2010, the company reported unaudited revenue of $1.7 billion and a network of 9.3 million distributors. In 2013 the publication New Vision reported that Forever Living had over 20,000 distributors in Uganda, of which only 83 had reached a managerial level and begun to recoup expenses; their investigation concluded that Forever Living Products' "distribution system does not guarantee profits and majority of members drop out along the way, after losing millions." The company was active in over 165 countries as of 2018. In February 2015, the company announced they had appointed a new management team to "oversee the affairs of the company in Nigeria."

In January 2023, the company named Aidan O'Hare as President with Gregg Maughan, son of founder Rex Maughan, continuing as CEO.

== Legal ==
In 1996, upon suggestion of the American authorities, the Internal Revenue Service (IRS) and the National Tax Agency of Japan (NTA) initiated a joint audit of Rex and Ruth Maughan and related entities Aloe Vera of America (AVA), Selective Art Inc., FLP International, and FLP Japan for the period of 1991 to 1995. In 1997, the NTA imposed a penalty tax of 3.5 billion yen on Forever Living's Japan division for concealing income of 7.7 billion yen over the five-year period. Later that year, AVA, Rex and Ruth Maughan, Maughan Holdings, Gene Yamagata, and Yamagata Holdings sued the IRS for unauthorized disclosure of tax return information. In the midst of the lawsuit, The IRS asked the NTA to drop its decision against Forever Living, and in 2002, the agency "grudgingly complied with the IRS's request", announcing that the penalty tax had been effectively withdrawn. In February 2015, a US district court ruled that the IRS knowingly provided some false information about AVA to the NTA, in violation of the United States' tax treaty with Japan and awarded three of the plaintiffs one thousand dollars each in statutory damages.

In 2004, claims made about Forever Living products were found to be in violation of several laws in Hungary related to advertising, registration of nutritional products, and the use of cosmetics as medicinal agents. As a result, the company was fined 60 million HUF (approximately US$280,000).

In 2007, author Richard Bach made claims against the company for copyright infringement and trademark infringement. The lawsuit stated that for over 20 years Forever Living had used the character, storyline, and copyrighted excerpts from the novel Jonathan Livingston Seagull to promote its marketing plan, and also used the motion picture and novel as its corporate logo. The claim was satisfied through arbitration, and shortly after, Forever Living changed its company logo from a seagull to an eagle.

In 2015, Forever Living was criticized by the UK Advertising Standards Authority for making false claims about the health benefits of its products, which were sold as a cure for various diseases ranging from diabetes to Crohn's disease. The company was also warned not to use health professionals in its promotional materials. Subsequently, the UK Medicines And Healthcare Products Regulatory Agency launched an investigation after it was revealed that NHS staff were moonlighting as sales people.

Between 2012 and 2016, several lawsuits were initiated by the Environmental Research Center (ERC) against Forever Living Products over alleged violations of Proposition 65 (the Safe Drinking Water and Toxic Exposure Act). The ERC accused Forever Living Products of having unsafe levels of lead in products manufactured by Aloe Vera of America and distributed by Forever Living. The claims were determined to be unfounded and the case was dismissed in the California Supreme Court in October, 2016.

== See also ==
- Old Thong Chai Medical Institution
- Nutraceutical
