= 2017 Samoa Honours and Awards =

The 2017 Samoa Honours and Awards were appointments made by the O le Ao o le Malo of Samoa, Tui Atua Tupua Tamasese Efi, to various Orders, decorations, and medals of Samoa under the Honours and Awards Act 1999. The investiture ceremony was held on 3 February 2017. Following this ceremony no awards were made for six years.

The recipients of honours are displayed here as they were styled before their new honour.

== Order of Merit of Samoa (OM) ==
- Mase Toia Alama
- Lupesoliai Joseph Parker

== Order of Samoa ==
=== Officers ===
- Hans Kruse
- Namulauulu Galumalemana Schmidt

=== Members ===
- Leilua Galuvao Dr. Faaalii Aloaina

== Head of State's Service Medal ==
- Lafaitele Aiga Poasa Tupae Esera
- Tuliafiafi Toafa Togai'u Li'o
- Mulitalo June Kolotita Oloalii
- Afemata Tunumafono Apelu Aiavao
- Fuaolefau-Le- Pouli Soonalote Naseri
- Maria Muagututi’a Sefo
- John Desmond Luff
