= Gatoloai Tili Afamasaga =

Samoan educator

Gatoloai Tili Afamasaga COS
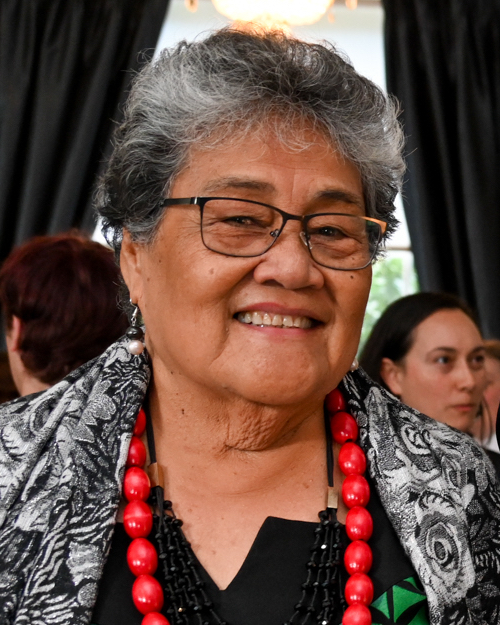
- Awards: Krishna Datt Award for Excellence in Trade Unionism and Leadership in the Pacific, 2016

Academic background
- Education: Victoria University of Wellington; Christchurch Teachers' College; Macquarie University

Gatoloaifa’aana Tilianamua Afamasaga COS (born 5 May 1947) is a Samoan educator. She has been active in teaching and teacher training for over 40 years. In 2016 she was awarded the Krishna Datt Award for Excellence in Trade Unionism and Leadership in the Pacific.

== Life ==
Afamasaga was educated at Samoa College in Samoa, and Hamilton Girls' High School and Christchurch Teachers' College in New Zealand, where she trained as a teacher. She later studied at Victoria University of Wellington and Macquarie University in Australia.

After teaching at Samoa College and Vaipouli College, in 1984 Afamasaga was appointed principal of Western Samoa Teachers College, a position she held for thirteen years. In 1997 the college merged with the National University of Samoa and she became the first Dean of the Faculty of Education. Eight years later, she became the first Director of the university's Oloamanu Centre for Professional Development and Continuing Education.

Afamasaga has been involved in the development of Samoa Qualifications Authority, and president of the Council of Pacific Education. In 2014 she became the founding president of the Samoa Workers Congress. She has also served as the co-ordinator for the Increasing Political Participation of Women in Samoa Programme, a joint programme between UN Women and the United Nations Development Programme. In 2013 she was appointed to a commission of inquiry investigating abuse of power at Tafaigata prison.

On 4 November 2022 she was appointed to the Samoa Public Service Commission.

In December 2022 the National University of Samoa announced they would be awarding her an Honorary Doctorate of Letters for her career as an educator.

She was made a companion of the Order of Samoa in the 2023 Samoa Honours and Awards.
