= Tupua Fred Wetzell =

Samoan businessman and philanthropist (1933–2016)

Tupua Friedrich Wilhelm Wetzell O.S. (13 May 1933 - 21 December 2016) was a Samoan businessman and philanthropist.

Wetsell was born in Moto’otua in Apia to a German-Samoan father and a Tongan-English mother. He was educated at Apia Primary School in Samoa, and then at Porongahao Secondary School and Napier Boys' High School in New Zealand. After completing an apprenticeship, he worked as a motor mechanic in Auckland before returning to Samoa where he ran a farm and a coconut plantation and worked as a scrap-metal merchant. In 1964 he returned to New Zealand, where he established a service station, before returning permanently to Samoa in 1971.

After failing to establish a resort at Lake Lanoto'o, in 1973 he founded Apia Concrete Products. In 1986 he established a plantation and a bottled water company. In 1996 he was appointed a director of the Sinalei Reef Resort. In 1997 he was named Japan's Honorary Consul-General to Samoa. From 2001 to 2006 he served on the board of Samoa Polytechnic. From 2007 to 2011 he served on the council of the National University of Samoa. Throughout his life he sponsored various sports teams and charities, including the Samoa International Game Fishing Association, Samoa Squash Rackets Association, Little Sisters’ of the Poor, and the Carmelite Sisters’ Monasteries of Samoa, Wallis & Futuna and Tonga.

== Honours and awards ==
Wetzell was granted the chiefly title of Tupua by his village for his philanthropic works. In 2013 he was conferred with the Order of the Rising Sun, with Gold Rays and Neck Ribbon, for his "significant contribution to the promotion of mutual understanding, and friendly relations between Japan and Samoa".

In the 2014 Samoa Honours and Awards he was made a Companion of the Order of Samoa.

The Tupua Fred Wetzell Championship Cup for the Vailima Marist rugby sevens tournament is named in his honour.
