= John Watts (composer) =

American composer (1929–1982)

John Everett Watts, Jr. (16 July 1929 – 2 July 1982) was an American composer of electronic music throughout the 1970s and 1980s. One of the medium's main advocates and teachers, Watts wrote about new music, experimenting with literary composition and journalism. Watts worked extensively with his wife, Laura Foreman, on performance art and dance pieces. Together, they formed the Composers and Choreographers Theatre, "an entity that quickly grew into a nationally recognized venue for contemporary dance and music in New York City."

From 1969 until 1982, Watts was a faculty member at the New School for Social Research in New York City. While there, he directed the Electronic Music Program and coordinated music workshops, concerts, and festivals.

== Biography and education ==
Watts was born in Maryville, Tennessee. He received a Bachelor of Arts degree (Music Composition) from University of Tennessee (1949) and commenced working on a master's degree there. However, with the outbreak of the Korean War he was drafted into the US Army (1950). He received a medical discharge from the Army in 1951.

Returning from the Army, Watts applied for and received a music scholarship to University of Colorado, where he received a Master of Arts degree (Music) in 1953. He transferred to University of Illinois to pursue a Doctorate in Music Composition, but moved to Cornell University when his principal advisor (Robert Palmer) left Illinois for Cornell. Before completing the degree requirements Watts took a leave of absence and taught Music at North Dakota Agricultural College in Fargo for a year (1956–57).

After Fargo, Watts studied music and composition, both independently and under the tutelage of Roy Harris. By 1964 he was ready to return to Cornell to complete the Ph.D., but his application was rejected.

== Musical career ==
Watts had studied music since his early teens, beginning with learning to play the clarinet. While working on his MA degree in Colorado he received the Thomas Berry Prize for Composition (1950). His study of music became intertwined with studies of painting and drawing, which apparently began when he met Charles Ragland Bunnell in Colorado. At a 1950 summer music festival Watts became acquainted with Roy Harris, who encouraged Watts to concentrate on composition. After the year of teaching in Fargo, Watts sought private studies with Harris (who was at Indiana University at the time). In 1958 (while studying with Harris) Watts began work on his Sonata for Piano, which was eventually given a Carnegie Hall premiere by David Del Tredici. Watts attended the Inter-American University of Puerto Rico (San Germán) during part of the 1960-61 academic year.

In 1962 Watts moved to New York City to teach in the Waltann School of Creative Arts (in Brooklyn), and at the North Shore Community Arts Center. It was during this time that he met dancer-choreographer Laura Foreman, whom he married in 1963 at Los Angeles, California. It was his third marriage (her first).

Watts continued to study informally with Harris as opportunity allowed. In 1964 Watts received a residency at Yaddo Arts Colony. When his 1964 re-application to Cornell University was rejected, Watts rekindled his interest in journalism, taking a post as editor of the weekly Manhattan East News (1965–67). He also taught music at Eron Preparatory School (1965–66), and edited The Journal of Prayer, a nondenominational inspirational publication (1967–70).

Watts founded the Composers Cooperative Society (1964), an organization dedicated to presenting concerts of new music. After his marriage, he and Foreman blended his program and her Laura Foreman Dance Company, calling the combined effort The Composers and Choreographers Theatre. It rapidly grew into a nationally recognized venue for music and dance. It was established as a non-profit corporation, and set up an artist-in-residence program in conjunction with the New School for Social Research. Watts served on the faculty of that school from 1969 until 1982, running the Electronic Music Program.

== Composition of electronic music ==
Watts established one of the first university electronic music/synthesizer programs in the country. He learned of the Moog synthesizer while working with Gershon Kingsley in the 1960s. Watts acquired a synthesizer in 1970 (an ARP String Synthesizer), giving his first public concert with it in 1972 (Elegy to Chimney: In Memoriam was the initial piece).

== Director ==
During the 1970s Watts tried to wear several hats: composer, soloist (on synthesizer), director of the Composers Theatre, director of Electronic Music Program at the New School. The most significant drain on his time was the Composers Theatre; he and Laura worked tirelessly to obtain and maintain funding for its projects. The measure of his success is seen in that during his tenure the CCT presented the works of over 200 composers, founded the Composers Festival Orchestra, and produced 3 LP recordings.

Watts and Foreman worked to receive publicity, to help generate funding sources. The greatest publicity they received was for an event which did not occur. A July 1981 article in the New York Times shows a poster of the Watts/Foreman presentation Wallwork with a “Sold Out” sign printed across the center. Not happening was the point of the concert, which was advertised—with ticket prices, date, time, and reservation telephone number— on posters all over New York City. When people called the number, they were told that no further names were being added to the waiting list. It was a hoax, though nobody was cheated out of any money. Newspaper writer Jack Anderson called the stunt “nutty and annoying” but said that “it does raise questions about the relationship between art and publicity.”

== Final years and death ==
Watts' last performed work (Time Coded Woman), was written for Lukas Foss and the Brooklyn Philharmonic’s “Meet the Moderns” series. It featured video footage by Laura Foreman, with electronic music tracks and orchestra. A test premiere at Cooper Union (2 April 1982) was well-received, but the actual premiere at the Brooklyn Academy of Music (3 April 1982) was not. This setback apparently combined with his loss of the teaching post from the New School, which occurred at about that same time, to drive Watts into a depressed state, and he died three months later.
