= Brian Lima =

Samoa international rugby union player

Brian Lima OM
- Born: Brian Pala Lima; 25 January 1972 (age 54) Apia, Samoa
- Height: 1.86 m (6 ft 1 in)
- Weight: 95 kg (14 st 13 lb; 209 lb)
- School: St Joseph's College, Samoa.

Rugby union career
- Position(s): Wing, Centre
Amateur team(s)
Years	Team	Apps	(Points)
1992–1996	Ponsonby		
Senior career
Years	Team	Apps	(Points)
1990–1992	Marist St. Joseph's		
1999–2001	Stade Français		
2001–2002	Swansea	12	(5)
2003–2004	Secom Rugguts	7	(0)
2005	Munster	0	(0)
2005–2007	Bristol	23	(25)
Provincial / State sides
Years	Team	Apps	(Points)
1992–1999	Auckland	30	(105)
Super Rugby
Years	Team	Apps	(Points)
1996	Highlanders	11	(30)
1997–1998	Blues	12	(35)
1999	Highlanders	13	(35)
International career
Years	Team	Apps	(Points)
1990–2007	Samoa	64	(140)
2004	Pacific Islanders	2	(0)
National sevens team
Years	Team		Comps
1993–2005	Samoa		

Brian Pala Lima OM (born 25 January 1972) is a Samoan former rugby union player who was inducted into the IRB Hall of Fame in 2011. He earned the nickname of "The Chiropractor" for his shuddering hits both on and off the pitch that supposedly rearranged the bones of the victim.

== National team ==
Lima was born in Apia, Samoa. He debuted for the Samoa national rugby union team in 1990. He featured in Samoa's famous World Cup win over Wales in 1991, and he was the youngest player at the 1991 Rugby World Cup.

One of Lima's most illuminating moments came in Samoa's match against South Africa in a group match at the 2003 Rugby World Cup. As Springbok fly-half Derick Hougaard leapt up in the air to catch a hospital pass, Lima "dive-tackled" him, sending Hougaard crashing to the ground.

Lima was the first player to appear in five World Cups, his fifth being the 2007 World Cup in France, in which he came on against South Africa in Samoa's first game after 60 minutes. Lima announced that he would retire after the 2007 Rugby World Cup. Michael Jones, the Samoa coach (at that time), announced Lima as the captain for the first game of that year's Pacific Nations Cup. Brian Lima was selected to lead Samoa against Fiji. This game was one of Lima's last games on Samoan soil.

Lima also played for the Samoa national rugby sevens team. He scored 17 tries in various Rugby World Cup Sevens tournaments, ranking him third all-time in career World Cup Sevens tries.

== Professional ==
Lima signed for Munster after an impressive game for the southern hemisphere vs the northern hemisphere in a fundraising game for the 2004 tsunami. However Lima was injured shortly after landing in Ireland and never got to pull on the Munster jersey. He has also played for the Blues, Auckland, the Highlanders, and Secom in Japan. He signed a two-year deal with Bristol starting in the 2005–06 season.

In December 2013 Lima was charged with causing actual bodily harm and being armed with a dangerous weapon after publicly assaulting and injuring his ex-wife. He subsequently resigned as coach of the Samoan national team. In June 2014 he was convicted on five charges and sentenced to two years supervision.

In August 2020 he was appointed head coach of the Samoa national rugby sevens team.

== Honours and awards ==
Lima was appointed to the Order of Merit of Samoa in the 2014 Samoa Honours and Awards. In 2024, he was an inaugural inductee into the Pasifika Rugby Hall of Fame.
