= Jeya Wilson =

New Zealand political activist and NGO leader (born 1951)

- Born: 1951 (age 74–75); Dominion of Ceylon

Academic background
- Education: Victoria University of Wellington, University of Oxford
- Thesis: Sanctions and South Africa (1995)
- Doctoral advisor: John Vincent, Andrew Walter, Peter G. J. Pulzer, Kenneth Kirkwood
- Other advisors: Stephen Levine, Margaret Clark

Jeya Wilson (born 1951) is a Sri Lankan–New Zealand political activist and NGO leader. She is most well-known for being the person who invited New Zealand prime minister David Lange to debate the moral indefensibility of nuclear weapons at the Oxford Union.

== Early life and education ==
Wilson was born in what is today Sri Lanka in 1951. Her father was a teacher, and later principal of the teacher training college in Samoa. The family spent two years in Birmingham, England, when Wilson was eight, and during high school she went on a school exchange to America. Wilson was there in 1968, and describes it as "a watershed year – both in my life, and internationally". She witnessed the political upheaval caused by the assassinations of Robert F. Kennedy and Martin Luther King Jr. and the Vietnam war protest movement, as well as being aware of international events such as the strikes in France threatening the government, and the Prague Spring. Wilson rejoined her family in Apia, Samoa, where she attended Samoa College, then led by Albert Wendt. In 1972 Wilson moved to New Zealand, where she completed a Bachelor of Arts in political science at Victoria University of Wellington, in which she also took courses on te reo Māori.

== Career ==
After graduation, Wilson worked for Consumer NZ and the Department of Trade and Industry, and became involved with the anti-apartheid movement. She applied for a visa for South Africa with then-partner Peter Utting, expecting to be declined, but they were granted permission and travelled there in 1981. In 1982 they published a memoir of their experiences in apartheid South Africa as a mixed-race couple.

Wilson earned a Commonwealth Scholarship to attend St Antony’s College at the University of Oxford, where she completed a PhD titled Sanctions and South Africa. Wilson had won the Australasian Debating Championships, and represented Oxford at the World Debating Championships. Wilson had met New Zealand prime minister David Lange during her anti-apartheid work, and she invited him to the 1985 Oxford Union debate "This House Believes Nuclear Weapons are Morally Indefensible", during which he gave his famous line about smelling uranium on his opponent's breath. She was the opening speaker and only other New Zealander on the four-person team. The following year, Wilson was elected president of the Oxford Union. The only previous woman of colour to hold that position was Benazir Bhutto. Wilson credits her debating skills with her success at the Union.

Wilson moved to South Africa with her husband in 1989, when he was offered a university position. At that time she could not own a share in their house without accepting the status of 'honorary white', which she refused to do. Wilson was the CEO of the Chamber of Commerce and Industry in Durban for five years, during which time she set up the world's first HIV/AIDS and Business Centre, and was New Zealand's Honorary Consul in South Africa.

Wilson was chief executive of the World Heart Federation in Switzerland, and spent 14 years living in Geneva. She is or has been a board member of a number of organisations, including the Commonwealth Sport Foundation, Avaaz, Adam Smith International and Fairtrade International. She has also worked for the World Health Organisation and the UN Development Programme.

Wilson and her husband retired to Whanganui in 2021.

== Selected works ==
- Wilson, Jeya; Utting, Peter (1982). Babes in VerWoerds: Two New Zealanders in South Africa. Petone, N.Z.: Price Milburn. ISBN 0705508498.
- Wilson, Jeya (1993). Ukwenza Intando Yeningi Isebenze – Making Democracy Work. Durban: Community Law Centre.
- Jeya Wilson (1983). "The Professionals: A Study of Women in Parliament". Political Science. 35 (2): 198–228. doi:10.1177/003231878303500203. Wikidata Q130325602.
