= Laura Foreman (dancer) =

American sculptor

Laura Foreman (died 2001) was a dancer, choreographer, visual artist, writer and director of dance at New School University. She lived and worked in New York City from the mid-1960s until her death.

== Biography ==
Foreman worked primarily in dance for the first decade of her time in Manhattan, operating both the Laura Foreman Dance Company and Composers' and Choreographers' Theatre with her husband, John Watts. In the late 1970s she began working in more abstract performance and visual art. Perhaps her most well-known piece was 1981's "Wallwork," a collaboration with Watts which took the form of a rigorous advertising campaign for a nonexistent performance.

After Watts's death in 1982, Foreman's work shifted towards visual art and writing. Two of her written pieces, "A Little Bell Gone Berserk" and "Stuff", were published in The Act in 1987. She created an extensive sculpture series, "Birdhouse as Metaphor," which consisted of numerous functional and non-functional birdhouses and showed in 1990 at Souyun Yi Gallery. In 1997, Close Encounters, a volume of Foreman's short stories, was published by Outloud Books.

Foreman died of cancer in Manhattan in 2001.

== Stage works ==
- Solo Suite (1967)
- A Time (1968)
- Perimeters (1969)
- Untitled (1970)
- Epicycles (1970)
- Signals (1970)
- glass and shadows (1971)
- Laura's Dance (1971)
- Songandance (1972)
- Margins (1972)
- Spaces (1972)
- Locrian (1973)
- Performance (1973)
- city of angels (1974)
- a deux (1974)
- Postludes (1974)
- Bud / Monopoly (1975)
- Program (1976)
- Heirlooms (1977)
- Entries (1978)

== Artworks ==
- TimeCoded Woman (1979–80)
- Coney Island Cray-Pas (1981)
- Philadelphia Story (1981)
- Poetry Peep Show (1981)
- Roomwork (1981)
- Wallwork (1981)
- Reclining Nudes (1982)
- Sweet Land of Liberty (1983)
- Word Painting / I have nothing to paint and I'm painting it (1983)
- Birdhouse as Metaphor (1989–93)
- Cry Uncle (1991)
- Window on the World (1995)
- Shacks of America (undated)

== Written works ==
- A Little Bell Gone Berserk (1987)
- Stuff (1987)
- A Message to Michael (1990)
- Close Encounters (1997)
