= Mase Toia Alama =

Samoan doctor and civil servant (died 2022)

Mase Fetuao Toia Fiti Alama OM (1951? — 7 May 2022) was a Samoan doctor and civil servant. She served as Clerk of the Legislative Assembly of Samoa, Registrar of Electors, and Chief Electoral Officer of Samoa.

Alama was educated at the Fiji School of Medicine in Suva, Fiji, and at the University of Auckland in New Zealand. In 1980 she became the first Samoan to become a member of the Royal College of Obstetricians and Gynaecologists. She subsequently worked as manager of the National Health Services and superintendent of Tupua Tamasese Meaole Hospital. She was later appointed Clerk of the Legislative Assembly, Registrar of Electors, and Chief Electoral Officer. In the latter role she oversaw the 1990 Western Samoan constitutional referendum and 1991, 1996 and 2001 elections. Her management of elections was controversial, with opposition parties alleging a conflict of interest as her husband was a candidate. In the 2001 election there was further controversy, with the opposition Samoan National Development Party alleging discrepancies in the vote count.

She was made a member of the Order of Merit of Samoa in the 2017 Samoa Honours and Awards.
