= Malua =

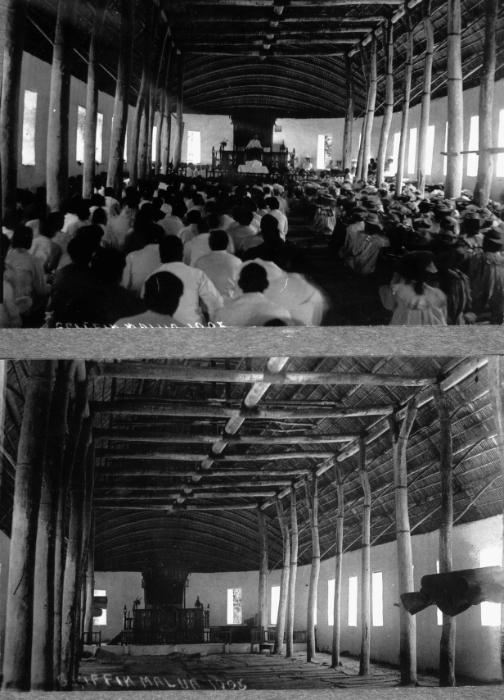
Interior of a church in Malua village, 1905, showing Samoan architecture incorporated into the building.

Malua is a small village on the Samoan island of Upolu. The name originates from the Samoan word "Maluapapa" which is translated 'shelter under the rock'. It is located on the northwestern coast of the island in the electoral constituency (faipule district) of Sagaga Le Falefa which forms part of the larger political district Tuamasaga.

The population of Malua is 365.

Malua is the centre for the Congregational Christian Church in Samoa and also the site of the famous Malua Theological College which was the second theological college to be established in the South Pacific in 1844, the first being Takamoa Theological College in Cook Islands. Founded by the London Missionary Society, Malua quickly became the centre for training pastors and missionaries in the Pacific. Today Malua is where all activities for the Congregational Christian Church in Samoa are centred, especially its General Assembly held annually in May.

A prominent Samoan who attended Malua Theological College was historian Teo Tuvale whose father, a pastor at Faleasi'u village, had been one of the first students to study at the seminary during the 19th century.
