= Hans Kruse =

Samoan actor, rugby player, and civil servant (1930–2021)

- Born: Hans Edward Kruse; 6 January 1930 Asau, Samoa
- Died: 2 October 2021 (aged 91)

Rugby union career
- Position: Hooker
International career
Years	Team	Apps	(Points)
1963	Samoa	3	(0)

Hans Edward Kruse OS (6 January 1930 – 2 October 2021) was a Samoan civil servant, actor, and rugby player.

Kruse was from Asau on Savai'i. He was educated at Marist Brothers Primary School in Mulivai, Sacred Heart College, Auckland, and Thailand University. As a young man he acted in the films Return to Paradise and Pacific Destiny. In 1953 he married Moana Meredith. In 1963 he captained the Samoa national rugby union team at the 1963 South Pacific Games.

He later worked as a civil servant, for the Public Service Commission, Customs Department, broadcasting service and as Director for the Department of Economic Development. In the private sector, he established a tobacco factory and Samoa Breweries. He then served on the board of the Central Bank of Samoa.

Kruse was appointed an Officer of the Order of Samoa in the 2017 Samoa Honours and Awards. On his death in 2021 he was given a state funeral.
