= Tufuga Samuelu Atoa =

Tufuga Samuelu Atoa OM (~1927 — 29 June 1998) was a Samoan civil servant, educator, and sports administrator. He was chair of Western Samoa's Public Service Commission and managed Western Samoa's team at the 1996 Summer Olympics.

Tufuga was the first Samoan awarded a scholarship to Brigham Young University, graduating in 1957 with a bachelor's degree in political science, and in 1974 with a master's in education administration. In 1962 he was awarded the matai title of Tufuga by his village.

Tufuga returned to Western Samoa in 1958. In 1962 he was Assistant Public Services Commissioner. In 1965 he was appointed Public Service Commissioner, replacing Leiataualesa Vaiao Alailima. He resigned in 1971 for personal reasons. In 1973 he was appointed director of latter Day Saints schools in Western Samoa. He later served as a board member of the National University of Samoa and as a government-appointed director of Polynesian Airlines.

Tufuga was administrator for the 1983 South Pacific Games held in Apia, and later managed Samoa's team for the 1996 Summer Olympics.

== Recognition ==
In 1994 he was awarded the Distinguished Service Award by the Western Samoa Sports Federation and the National Olympic Committee.

In July 1995 he was made a member of the Order of Merit of Western Samoa.
