= Aiono Fanaafi Le Tagaloa =

Samoan politician and historian

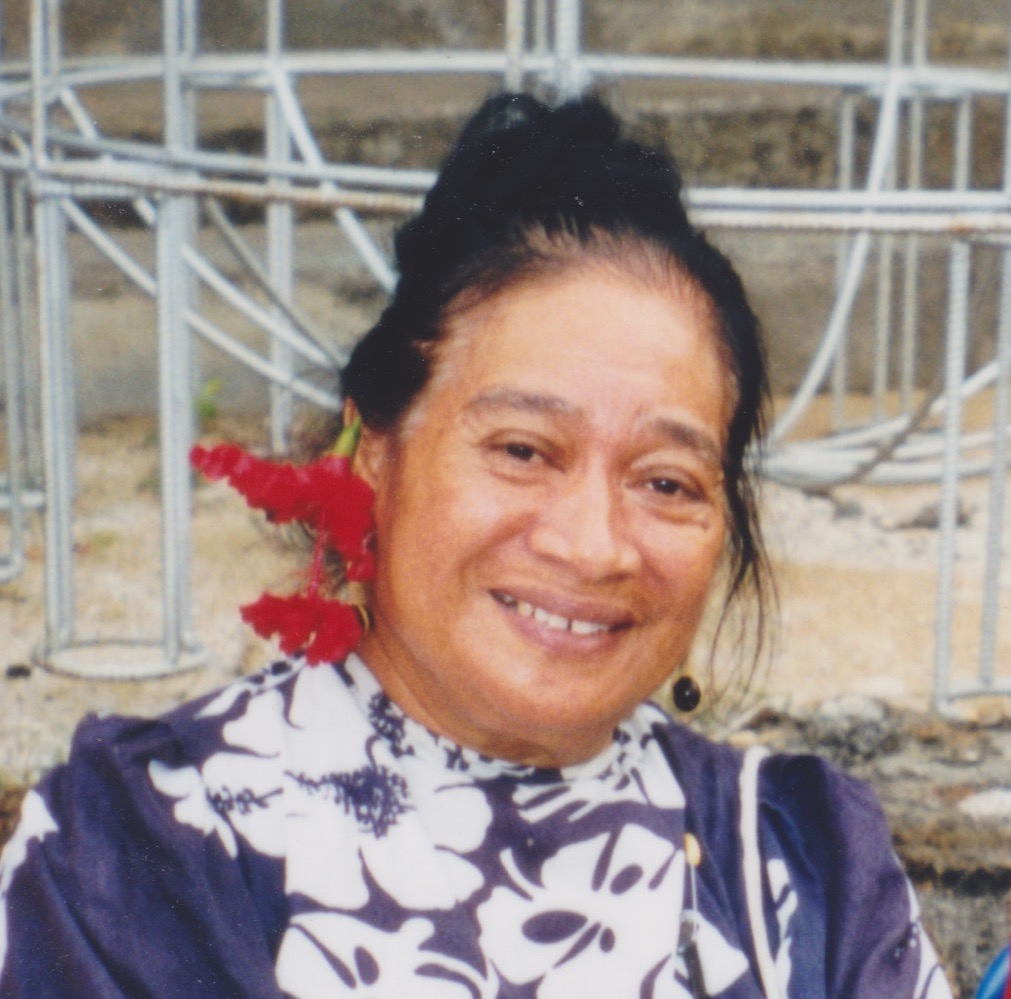
- Born: 25 June 1932
- Died: 14 August 2014 (aged 82)

Academic background
- Education: Victoria University of Wellington (MA); University of London (PhD)
- Thesis: Bilingualism and its Socio-Economic and Philosophical Implications in a Society Forced to be Bilingual.

Aiono Fanaafi Le Tagaloa OM (25 June 1932 – 14 August 2014) was a chief (matai), scholar, historian and professor of Samoa. An authority on Samoan culture and language, she was one of the most educated female matai in the country with a PhD in educational philosophy and applied linguistics from the University of London.

She was instrumental in formulating and implementing bi-cultural and bi-lingual education in Samoa, in particular, during her tenure as Director of Education for the government as the country moved from colonial rule to political independence in the early 1960s. She held other senior positions in education in Samoa, including Professor of Samoan Studies at the National University of Samoa and principal of Samoa Teachers' College.

Her distinguished career included politics and she was a former Member of Parliament in Samoa, having first entered parliament at the 1985 general election under the Human Rights Protection Party (HRPP). In 1997, she founded the Indigenous University of Samoa (Le Iunivesite o le Amosa o Savavau). The university curriculum is taught in the Samoan language with qualifications in Bachelor of Arts and Master of Arts degrees.

She published extensively about Samoan history, land rights, fa'amatai chiefly governance and fa'a Samoa socio-political issues, as well as the role of women and children in the Pacific Islands. Her scholarly work and publications have been widely read and cited.

== Family ==
Aiono Fanaafi was married to Le Tagaloa Pita, a high chief of Sili village on Savai'i island, who is also a former parliamentarian with cabinet portfolios. Her daughter To'oto'oleaava Dr. Fanaafi Le Tagaloa, is a lawyer, writer, and head of Samoan International Finance Authority.

== Education ==
Aiono Fanaafi was born in Samoa and attended Malifa Primary School near Apia on the island of Upolu. She attended intermediate and grammar schools in New Zealand. She later attended Ardmore Teachers' College in Auckland where she graduated in 1954. She completed her Bachelor of Arts degree in 1957. Her Master of Arts degree was completed at Victoria University of Wellington. Her Master's thesis was titled The Pattern of Education and the Factors Influencing that Development in the New Zealand Dependencies in the Pacific.

Her outstanding academic achievements in New Zealand earned her the prestigious MacKintosh Travelling Scholarship, becoming the first Pacific Islander to do so. The scholarship allowed her to study for her doctorate at the University of London which she completed in 1960. Her doctoral dissertation was titled Bilingualism and its Socio-Economic and Philosophical Implications in a Society Forced to be Bilingual.

== Career in education ==
After completing her PhD in London, Aiono Fanaafi lectured at Victoria University in New Zealand for four years. In 1965, she became the Principal of Samoa Teachers' College. She briefly held the position of Deputy Director of Education for the Samoan government before her appointment as Director, a position she held from December 1968 until March 1975. From 1976 to 1981, she worked in the same role for the Congregational Christian Church in Samoa. From 1982 – 1985, she was Vice-Chancellor of the National University of Samoa.

== Recognition ==
In 2005 she was made a member of the Order of Merit of Samoa.

== Works ==
- 1968 Curriculum Plan for the University of South Pacific, University of the South Pacific
- 1986 The Status and Roles of Females in Traditional and Modern Samoa (paper), UNESCO
- The Samoan Lady in Society and as a Healer (paper)
- The Economic Roles of Females in Samoan Society (paper)
- The Social Structure of the Samoan Village (paper)
- 1992 Culture and Democracy in the South Pacific, Institute of Pacific Studies, University of the South Pacific, ISBN 982-02-0079-2
- 1997 O le Faasinomaga : le tagata ma lona Faasinomaga, Lamepa Press, ISBN 982-355-002-6
