= Radio Polynesia =

Radio Polynesia is a major radio station and source of news and information in Samoa. Founded in 1989, the radio station's head office is situated in Savalalo, in the capital Apia. Radio Polynesia operates four separate radio stations, broadcasting in both English and Samoan. In 1998, the station launched Talofa FM, broadcast only in the Samoan language with 100% national coverage including the outer island of Savai'i.

Radio Polynesia is owned by promoter and businessman Maposua Rudolf Keil, who also owns the local Majik Cinema in Apia. The radio station is managed by his son Corey Keil. Olga Keil is a journalist based with the station.

A celebration marking of the 20th anniversary of Radio Polynesia was originally scheduled to take place on Tuesday, September 29, 2009. However, the celebration was cancelled due to the 2009 Samoa earthquake and tsunami, which devastated the country the same day.
