= Eti Saaga =

American Samoan journalist, press officer, TV and radio host, and producer

- Born: February 2, 1950; American Samoan
- Died: December 13, 2017 (aged 67)
- Occupations: poet, writer, journalist, press officer, television and radio host, and producer

Eti Saaga, also spelled Eti Sa'aga, (February 2, 1950 – December 13, 2017) was a Samoan-born American Samoan poet, writer, journalist, press officer, television and radio host, and producer. His most well-known poem, "Me the Labourer", is studied as part of the curriculum at universities throughout Oceania, including Fiji, New Zealand, and his native Samoa. Saaga, who emigrating from Samoa to American Samoa in 1978, also served as a speech writer, press officer and translator for the late U.S. Congressman Eni Faleomavaega for more than 20 years.

Saaga was born on February 2, 1950, in Apia, Samoa. In 1970, Saaga graduated from Samoa College, where he studied under Albert Wendt, an English teacher and novelist who was one of his greatest influences. He did not accept a scholarship offer to study in New Zealand, choosing, instead to work as a road builder and labourer in Samoa. During this time, Saaga wrote his most famous poem, "Me the Labourer", which is now taught at colleges and universities throughout Australia and the Pacific Islands.

Saaga next worked as a journalist for the Samoa Times, based in Apia, during the 1970s. In 1978, he emigrated to nearby American Samoa with his wife, Otilia Hunkin Saaga. He soon became a press officer for the American Samoan Department of Education.

Saaga then worked for the late U.S. Congressman Eni Faleomavaega (D-AS) for more than twenty years as a senior aide, press officer, speechwriter, and translator. He also worked as a broadcaster and announcer for KSBS-FM Flag Day programming during this same era.

Saaga died at the Kuakini Medical Centre in Honolulu, Hawaii, on December 13, 2017, at the age of 67. He had been in declining health for the previous six years. He was predeceased by his wife, Otilia Hunkin Saaga, and survived by their four children.
