= Joint audit =

Audit report by two of more auditors

A joint audit is an audit on a legal entity (the auditee) by two or more auditors to produce a single audit report, thereby sharing responsibility for the audit. A typical joint audit has audit planning performed jointly and fieldwork allocated to the auditors. The auditors are typically not individuals, but auditing firms. This work allocation may be rotated after a set number of years to mitigate the risk of over-familiarity. Work performed by each auditor is reviewed by the other, in most cases by exchanging audit summary reports. The critical issues at group level, including group consolidation, are reviewed jointly and there is joint reporting to the legal entity's management, its audit committee, a government entity, or the general public.

A joint audit is different from a dual audit, where a dual audit is performed by two independent auditors issuing their own separate reports, which are then used by another auditor that ultimately reports on the entity as a whole. Since the audit reform in 2014 in Europe, joint auditing is encouraged but not obligated by the law. In combination with mandatory rotation it's effective to diversify the audit market. In France the joint audit system is obligated by law for PIE's.

== Uses ==
Joint audits are used internationally, including in India, Denmark, Germany, Switzerland and the UK. In France, joint audit became a legal requirement in 1966, while in South Africa, a joint audit is mandatory for firms operating in the financial services sector. In the United States, a joint audits are performed by the Internal Revenue Service (IRS) by using various specialists and agents simultaneously in a single tax audit. The state of Maryland has a joint audit committee, composed of members of the State House of Representatives and State Senate, responsible for reviewing the legislative audit.

== Auditor competence and independence ==
Joint audit addresses two underlying principles of audit quality: auditors’ competence and independence. It enables a benchmarking of audit approaches and affords audit committees the opportunity to pick and choose the best local firms from within two global audit networks. Audit committees and investors have additional assurance that the audit opinion with which they are presented is complete. A joint audit allows rotation of audit firms, and retains knowledge and understanding of group operations in a way that minimizes the disruption caused when a single audit firm is changed. The rotation of audit firms is equally likely to mitigate the risk of over familiarity. Two firms can also stand stronger together against aggressive accounting treatments. In this way, joint audit effectively becomes a guardian for audit quality. The benchmarking that takes place between the two firms raises the level of service quality. In India, members of the company has the liberty to choose joint auditors.

== Market competition ==
A joint audit has a further benefit in that it can encourage more competition between audit firms. Despite the fact that two Big Four firms can still be used on a joint audit, there is an opportunity for companies to be more willing to engage other firms in the process. The Big Four then becomes the best seven or eight, as more firms are given the opportunity to demonstrate their capabilities, while clients can retain a Big Four signature where they feel it is needed. A recent report produced by consultants London Economics for the European Commission highlighted that France and Denmark (two countries with joint audits) are the two least concentrated audit markets in Europe.

Some critics believe that it is difficult for two firms, who outside of the joint audit are competitors, to easily co-operate with each other during the audit. The degree of co-operation, and its effectiveness, is essentially down to the spirit in which the two audit firms approach the joint audit. If they approach the audit with a willingness to work together to provide a company's shareholders with what they truly value – namely confidence in the financial position of the company in which they are investing – communication will not be a problem. If they favour competition over collaboration, the outcome is poor.

== Costs ==
Increased costs is the most commonly cited objection to joint audits. Joint audit adds approximately 10% to audit time, mostly at the highest levels of the audit team (managers and partners). In the longer term, it could bring about a reduction in audit costs as a result of (1) increased market competition, and (2) benchmarking of prices and efficiencies between the two joint auditors by the Audit Committee of the audited organization.

Joint audit delivers increased reporting on audit time and rates applied across the group. A recent comparative analysis of audit fees between Germany and France shows that companies with joint audit pay significantly less for their audit than companies without joint audit.

Joint audit increases time spent by the senior staff on the audit team, and the senior management of the group or organization.

== Joint Audit (Tax) ==
A joint tax audit is the examination of a business or individual tax return by a common audit team with members of two or more States examining cross-border tax situations as one tax audit to gain a uniform actual and legal assessment concerning this situation.
