= Saleimoa =

Saleimoa Village Of Warriors
- Village
- Location within Samoa
- Coordinates: 13.798269°S 171.881845°W
- Country: Samoa
- Island: Upolu

Population (2016)
  - Total: 3,816

Saleimoa is a small village on the Samoan island of Upolu. It is located on the northwestern coast of the island. The village is split into five sub-villages (Levi, Alamutu, Lotoso’a, Salepouae, and Nonoa) and has a total population of 3816. It is within an exclave of the Gagaʻemauga district, along with the neighbouring village of Le'auva'a.

The village has a primary school.
