= Journalists Association of (Western) Samoa =

The Journalists Association of (Western) Samoa (JAWS) is Samoa's national media association. It was founded in 1991 and is led by Lagi Keresoma.

JAWS is an independent body made up of local journalists working in the print, online, television and radio media. It promotes the role of a free media in Samoan society, and protects the rights of journalists in Samoa. JAWS is a legally registered incorporated society with the Ministry of Commerce Industry and Labour. JAWS issues statements regularly in regard to freedom of the press in Samoa.

In 2008 the International Federation of Journalists (IFJ) issued one statement in support of a complaint made by JAWS. The complaint was in regard to the censorship of the media by the office of the Ombudsman. IFJ issued a support statement calling for the lifting of the ban on the Samoan media. In 2009 in response to a statement by JAWS, the IFJ issued another statement supporting the organisation in discouraging the harassment of journalists at the Samoan courts.

In 2011 the body cut ties with the Pacific Islands News Association (PINA) after the Fiji-based body had stopped functioning in the wake of the 2006 Fijian coup d'état.

In 2013 JAWS was de-registered as an incorporated society after failing to complete its paperwork.

In 2018 JAWS opposed the Samoan governments reintroduction of criminal libel. In 2019 it opposed a ban on filming at parliament and plans by the Samoan government to criminalise leaking. In June 2020 it expressed surprise at discovering that the new Legislative Assembly of Samoa building did not include space for a press gallery.

In May 2021 it elected Lagi Keresoma as its first woman president.
