= Sataoa =

- Village
- Location within Samoa
- Coordinates: 13°59′S 171°50′W
- Country: Samoa
- District: Tuamasaga
- Time zone: -11

Sataoa is a small village situated on the central south coast of Upolu island in Samoa. Like many villages in the country, Sataoa has two settlements, one inland (Sataoa Uta) and one by the coast (Sataoa Tai). The population of Sataoa Uta is 1121 and Sataoa Tai is 239.

Satoa is part of Safata Electoral Constituency (Faipule District) which forms part of the larger political district of Tuamasaga.
