= Order of Merit of Samoa =

The Samoan Order of Merit is an order recognizing distinguished service in science, art, literature, or religion. Per the Honours and Awards Act 1999, admission into the organization is granted by the O le Ao o le Malo, presently Vaʻaletoʻa Sualauvi II, and is limited to 15 living individuals from Samoa, plus an unspecified number of foreigners. All members receive the ability to use the post-nominal letters OM and a medallion to wear, and in the Samoan order of precedence fall between Companions and Officers of the Order of Samoa.

== Current members ==
- Albert Wendt (appointed 1994)
- Seiuli Paul Wallwork (appointed 2014)
- Savea Sano Malifa (appointed 2014)
- Muliagatele Brian Pala Lima (appointed 2014)
- Adimaimalaga Tafuna’i (appointed 2014)
- Joseph Parker (appointed 2017)
- Tui Ātua Tupua Tamasese Efi (appointed 2023)
- Brother Kevin O’Malley (appointed 2023)
- Senara Tautiga (appointed 2023)
- Tupu Folasa II (appointed 2023)
- Emanuela Betham (appointed 2023)
- Luaipou Sally Betham (appointed 2023)
- Sapa’u Lilomaiava Lolesio Vitale (appointed 2023)
- Tuaopepe Jerry Wallwork (appointed 2023)

== Past members ==
- Mase Toia Alama (appointed 2017)
- Aiono Fanaafi Le Tagaloa (appointed 2005)
- Tufuga Samuelu Atoa (appointed 1995)
- Papali’i John Ryan (appointed 1994)
- Solialofi Tuuaimalo Pisimala (appointed 2023)

== Honorary members (non-citizens) ==
- Papali’i Chellaraj Satvadas Benjamin (appointed 2014)
- Taffy Gould (appointed 2014)
- Tilafaiga Rex Maughan (appointed 2014)
- Alistair Leighton Hutchinson (appointed 2014)
- Walter Vermeulen (appointed 2014)
