= Le Mamea Makalau =

Samoan high chief

Le Mamea Makalau also known as Le Mamea MK (died 10 September 1894) was a Samoan high chief, judge, civil servant, diplomat, and author. Le Mamea Makalau held the high chief title of Le Mamea from Matautu Lefaga. He held senior positions in the (precolonial) Samoan Kingdom where he served as Minister of the Interior in the government of King Malietoa Laupepa. He travelled to Washington DC as Samoa's Envoy Extraordinary and Plenipotentiary to negotiate a treaty with the United States to make Samoa a US protectorate.

== Treaty of Friendship and Commerce between the United States and the Samoan Islands ==
Le Mamea signed the Treaty of Friendship and Commerce between the United States and the Samoan Islands on 17 January 1878 which was ratified in 1878. This treaty gave the USA rights to set up a coaling station in Pago Pago on the island of Tutuila.

== Tusi o Faalupega ==
Le Mamea also commenced work on compiling the Tusi o Faalupega which included all the Ceremonial Samoan addresses. The book was completed and edited by two of his younger brothers, Te'o Tuvale and Faletoese Lipano.

== Family ==
Le Mamea was the son of Vaaelua Petaia (1822–1881), one of the first Samoan Christian converts to the London Missionary Society and the first pastor of Faleasiu. Two of his younger brothers Te'o Tuvale and Faletoese Lipano were also prominently involved in Samoan affairs in the subsequent colonial governments of Germany and New Zealand.

== See also ==
- Te’o Tuvale brother
- Faletoese Lipano brother
