= Paul Wallwork =

Samoan weightlifter, civil servant and sports administrator (1942–2024)

Seiuli Paul Wallwork OM (15 January 1942 – 14 March 2024) was a Samoan weightlifter, civil servant, and sports administrator. He was the first Samoan to win a medal at the Commonwealth Games, winning a Silver in weightlifting at the 1974 British Commonwealth Games in Christchurch, New Zealand. In 1999 he was one of six members of the International Olympic Committee implicated in the 2002 Winter Olympic bid scandal.

== Biography ==
Seiuli Paul Wallwork was born on 15 January 1942 and was educated at Avele College. He broke his neck while playing rugby in New Zealand as a youth, and began weightlifting to strengthen his leg and arm muscles after the injury left him with paralysis. He represented Samoa in the 1966, 1969, and 1971 South Pacific Games, winning a gold medal in each. In 1968 he moved to Australia to study at the University of Sydney. In 1969 he won the Australian weightlifting championship, and in 1972 the Australasian. He was offered a place on the Australian team for the 1972 Summer Olympics but declined as he did not want to renounce his Samoan citizenship. He subsequently represented Samoa in the 1974 Commonwealth Games, winning silver.

Wallwork later worked as permanent secretary for the Ministry of Youth, Sports and Cultural Affairs and headed the organising committee for the 1983 South Pacific Games. In 1987 Wallwork was appointed to the International Olympic Committee. In 1991 he was elected president of the South Pacific Games Council. In 1999 he was expelled from the IOC during the 2002 Winter Olympic bid scandal as his wife had received a $30,000 loan from a Salt Lake City official and his family had received more than $67,000 in travel benefits from Salt Lake City. He subsequently resigned from Samoa's National Olympic Committee.

Wallwork later served as president of the Oceania Weightlifting Federation and president of Rugby League Samoa.

Wallwork was appointed to the Order of Merit of Samoa in the 2014 Samoa Honours and Awards.

Wallwork died after a prolonged illness on 14 March 2024, at the age of 82.
