= Maposua Rudolf Keil =

Samoan businessman (died 2018)

- Born: Western Samoa
- Occupations: Business man, Entrepreneur, Radio station owner

Maposua Rudolf Keil (died May 2018) was a Samoan businessman and owner of the Radio Polynesia 98FM radio station. In 1997 it was one of the only radio stations in Western Samoa that were independently owned. He is also the owner of the Majik Cinema in Apia, and in 2007 along with fellow promoters, the Hon Peter Paul, the Hon Sala Ulugia Suivai and the Hon Polataivao Fosi Schmidt, was one of 10 recipients of the Samoa International Pro-Am Boxing Honorary Awards. In 2003 he received a recommendation from Samoa's Ministry of Health for his "significant contribution by broadcasting the proceedings of the symposium free of charge".

== Discussion of radio station closure ==
In 1997 there were discussions by the Samoan government that the station be closed down. Rudolf Keil told the Tala Nei news agency that his radio station had asked to interview Tofilau Eti Alesana, Samoa's prime minister and with other cabinet ministers, but they had refused.

== Media ==
In 2006 Keil came up against censors with the banning of the Da Vinci Code in Samoa. He said he had been stopped from showing the movie even though a documentaries on the plot of The Da Vinci Code were being broadcast by a local television station. He alleged that bootlegged DVDs and VHS videos of the film were being rented out by video shops. On 9 June he returned the movie to New Zealand, but LAU TV broadcast the documentary on the 11th of that month. The obvious reason for the ban was Samoa being a Christian country and Samoan church leaders said the film went against the Christian principles, upon which the island nation's constitution is based. In his criticism of the ban, Keil said the constitution also gave adults the right to decide what they wanted to watch.

In June 2007 Keil was in the news defending his decision to stop two of his journalists from attending media conferences. His decision to stop them from attending conferences by Asiata Sale'imoa Va'ai, leader of the Samoa Democratic United Party was based on his not wanting his station doesn't want his station airing unproven allegations by Asiata. One of the two reporters banned was veteran reporter Autagavaia Tipi Autagavaia

== Death ==
Keil died in May, 2018 at age 83.
