= Samoa Observer =

Samoan daily newspaper

- Type: Newspaper
- Owner: Samoa Observer Limited
- Publisher: Muliaga Jean Ash Malifa
- Editor-in-chief: Savea Sano Malifa
- Founded: 1978
- Headquarters: Apia, Samoa
- Website: samoaobserver.ws

The Samoa Observer is the largest newspaper group in Samoa published in both English and Samoan. The Samoa Observer is published Monday to Friday, the Weekend Observer on Saturdays and the Sunday Samoan on Sundays with all editions available online. Coverage includes local and international news, editorial opinion, sports and investigative journalism. The main offices are located in Apia, the country's capital.

The Samoa Observer was founded in 1978 by Editor in Chief, Savea Sano Malifa, a poet and leading Pacific journalist who was awarded the prestigious Commonwealth Astor Award for press freedom in 1998.

The independent paper has received other awards for investigative journalism and press freedom. It has faced repeated lawsuits from government officials and business leaders following the publication of stories about corruption and abuse of public office in Samoa. In 1981 it was sued for defamation by Justice Minister Asi Eikeni after alleging that he had smuggled furniture into the country. The court found that the allegation was true. In 1987 the newspaper was sued for libel by cabinet minister Le Tagaloa Pita for alleging that he had behaved corruptly in the administration of a banana plantation. In 1990 editor Leota Uelese Petaia was jailed for eight days for contempt of court after alleging judge Patu Tiava'asu'e Falefatu Sapolu had a conflict of interest in a murder trial. The verdict was later overturned by the Court of Appeal. In 1996 the government withdrew all advertising from the Observer as punishment for critical reporting. In 1998 it was sued for defamation by prime minister Tofilau Eti Alesana, with the courts awarding Alesana $50,000 in damages. The same year the government announced that it would fund any government MP or official to lodge defamation proceedings.

In 1994, the paper's offices were destroyed in a fire after official corruption stories.

In November 2025, the paper was banned from covering press briefings of Samoan prime minister Laʻauli Leuatea Schmidt, over its reporting on Schmidt's eight-week medical stay in New Zealand. Schmidt claimed the reporting was inaccurate.
