= Teo Tuvale =

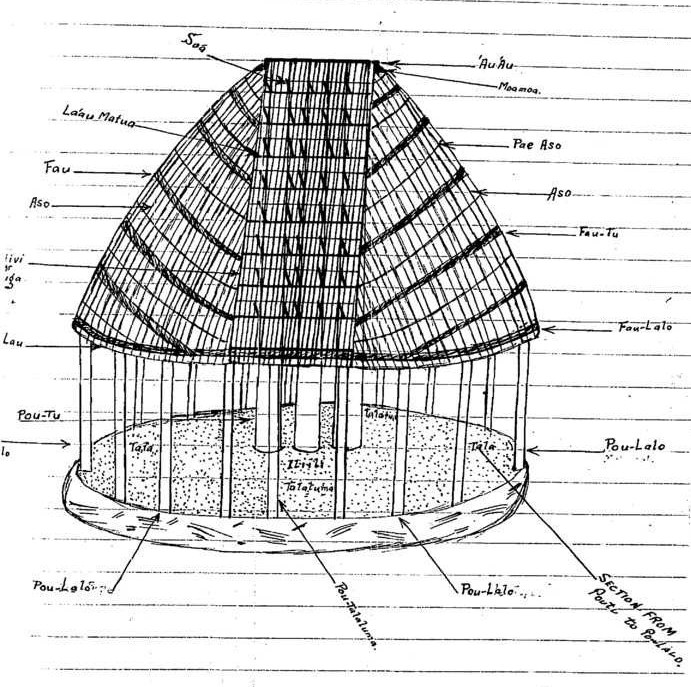
Drawing of a Samoan house from An Account of Samoan History up to 1918 by Teo Tuvale

Teo Tuvale (26 August 1855 – December 1919) was a notable Samoan historian who served terms as Chief Justice and Secretary to Government in Samoa during the era of colonialism.

Tuvale is the author of An account of Samoan History up to 1918, a key historical text in Samoan history which includes first hand accounts of the rivalry between European colonial powers and Samoan chiefly families. He was also an official translator and spoke English, German and some Fijian.

== Background ==
Tuvale was born in Faleasiu village on the north coast of Upolu island. His father was Vaaelua Petaia (1822–1881), one of the first Samoan Christian converts to the London Missionary Society and the first pastor of Faleasiu. Following in his father's footsteps, Tuvale attended the seminary at Malua village in 1875. The Malua Theological College had been established in 1844. He taught at the Malua training school in 1877. An older brother with the family's matai chief title of Le Mamea Makalau was a Samoan official in the government and helped him to get work in the administration. In 1878, he was appointed assistant secretary to the official indigenous Samoa government based at the village of Mulinuʻu. He held successive positions through different colonial regimes. He spent some years in Fiji where he became friends with Fiji's paramount chief Ratu Cakobau. In 1900, he led a group of traditional dancers to Germany where he met the Kaiser. He was a translator for Wilhelm Solf, the German governor in Samoa.

He also worked as a government translator, and wrote the historical account in 1918 at the behest of Colonel Robert Logan, the commander of the British Military Occupation.

== Historian ==
Tuvale's historical works included detailed recordings of Samoan architecture, genealogies (gafa), fa'a Samoa, culture, language and ceremonies.

Tuvale writes in the introduction of An Account of Samoan History up to 1918;

Although the stories and opinions from different districts differ and lack a single origin, yet they have been recorded. The recording has not been done under the eye of a critic for Samoan stories in the days of darkness were treasured in the heart and not written. I, Teo Tuvale, have tried to gather these stories over many years for my own use and interest. Colonel Robert Logan intimated to me that he wished me to put on record the story of happenings in Samoa from ancient times to the present day in order that they should be issued in printed form, and I attempt to obey his wish with this object in view.

Tuvale also helped two brothers compile another important historical document Tusi Fa'alupega (Samoan ceremonial greetings in oratory) which was given to the London Missionary Society.

== Death ==
Tuvale's last job was supervising the burial of the dead during the 1918 flu epidemic which killed an estimated 22% (8,500) of Samoa's population. He died in December 1919, immediately following the epidemic. He is buried in Faleasiu.

== Descendants ==
Tuvale is the grandfather of Samoan author, educator and professor Peggy Fairbairn-Dunlop and great-grandfather of New Zealand High Commissioner to South Africa Emma Dunlop-Bennett.

== See also ==
- Le Mamea Makalau brother
- Faletoese Lipano brother
- Peggy Fairbain-Dunlop granddaughter
