= Orders, decorations, and medals of Samoa =

The Honours and Awards System of Samoa has its basis in the Merit Act 1992/1993 and the Honours and Awards Act 1999. From 1914 to 1962, Samoa was governed as the Western Samoa Trust Territory by the United Kingdom and New Zealand. During this time, awards of the British honours system were made to select individuals. For example, the first Prime Minister of Samoa, Fiame Mata'afa Faumuina Mulinu'u II was made a Commander of the Order of the British Empire and Le Mamea Matatumua Ata, a framer of the constitution of Samoa, was made an Officer of the Order of the British Empire on the New Zealand list in the 1960 Birthday Honours.

Established by the act of 1992 and reaffirmed by the act of 1999, the Honours and Awards Committee is a part of the Ministry of the Prime Minister and Cabinet Office. The committee is responsible for considering those who may be eligible for awards or honorary awards and recommending those deemed worthy of awards to the Cabinet. The committee also reviews those who are prior award recipients and may recommend the granting of subsequent higher awards where deemed appropriate.

== History ==
After the independence of Samoa, the first award created was the Grand Order of Vailima. This order was intended to be Samoa's highest decoration of honour. The order was first awarded to Queen Elizabeth II when she visited Samoa on 11 February 1977 during the Silver Jubilee Pacific tour.

On 28 May 1992, the Parliament of Samoa passed AN ACT to provide for the conferring or granting of awards in recognition of acts of heroism or meritorious service to Western Samoa, known as the Merit Act 1992/1993. This act set up the administrative mechanisms to manage the recommending and presentation of awards. It set forth that the Head of State, acting upon the advice of the cabinet, could make awards to worthy individuals. It further established the Merit Board to consider individuals eligible for awards and making recommendations to the cabinet of those persons. Individuals deemed worthy of recognition who were not Samoan citizens could be granted an honorary award. Holders of honorary awards do not figure into the total number of award holders. The act further spelled out monetary payments that were to be made to recipients upon being granted an award. The act set forth the following awards:

- Malietoa Tanumafili II Distinguished Service Order (M.T.II.D.S.O.) – Conferred for exceptional bravery or heroism in the preservation of life or order, or the preservation of property or things needed for the national interest in the face of any disaster or emergency. This award is the only one that may be made posthumously. The order is limited to no more than 15 living recipients. Individuals who have been awarded the Malietoa Tanumafili II Distinguished Service Order are also awarded a tax exempt payment of $1,500.
- Western Samoa Order of Tiafau (W.S.O.T.) – Conferred for long and outstanding public and private service to Samoa. It could also be awarded to leaders of corporations, foreign states, or organizations who have provided lengthy valuable service and friendship to Samoa. Eligible foreign leaders would be Heads of state, Governors, Prime Ministers, Cabinet Ministers or holders of equivalent offices. The Western Samoa Order of Tiafau is limited to 20 living recipients. Samoan recipients were awarded a tax exempt payment of $1,000.
- Western Samoa Order of Merit (W.S.O.M.) – Conferred for outstanding achievement which brings a direct or indirect benefit to Western Samoa, or brings credit to Western Samoa. Eligible individuals are Members of Parliament or Ministers of State, members of an organization devoted to the welfare of Samoa or Samoans, a self-employed person, an employee, a volunteer, an academic or student, those engaged in literary activity, those engaged in the arts or crafts, and sports persons. The Western Samoa Order of Merit was limited to 20 living recipients. Samoan recipients were awarded a tax exempt payment of $1,000.
- Western Samoa Certificate of Excellence (W.S.C.E.) – Conferred for exceptionally high achievement which brings a direct or indirect benefit to Western Samoa, or brings credit to Western Samoa. Eligible individuals are Members of Parliament or Ministers of State, members of an organization devoted to the welfare of Samoa or Samoans, a self-employed person, an employee, a volunteer, an academic or student, those engaged in literary activity, those engaged in the arts or crafts, and sports persons. The Western Samoa Certificate of Excellence may is limited to 20 awards per year. Samoan recipients were awarded a tax exempt payment of $500.

== Current honours and awards ==
The current honours system came about on 25 August 1999 with the passage of AN ACT to repeal the Merit Act 1992/1993, No. 3 and to consolidate the system for the conferring of awards in recognition of meritorious service to Samoa or acts of bravery. also known by its short title as the Honours and Awards Act 1999. This act did away with all of the awards of the Merit Act 1992/1993, but left in place many of the mechanisms for administering and awarding its honours. Among them is the retaining of the Merit Board, but renaming it the Honours and Awards Committee. The honours awarded under the Merit Act 1992/1993 are still considered valid and they maintain their status and recognition. There is a further section that states any honours not attached to the Merit Act 1992/1993 are also still valid and maintain their status and recognition. Monetary awards are limited to only the top two gallantry awards under the act of 1999.

The Honours and Awards Act 1999 divides awards into two distinct categories: awards for civil service and awards for bravery and gallantry. The act defines civil service as, "...service of Samoa in any capacity, and includes service in the private and religious sectors." The awards established by the act are as follows, in their order of precedence:

Awards for Civil Service

- Grand Order of Samoa – Special Class (G.O.S.)
- Order of Samoa – Poloaiga Sili a Samoa
- Order of Samoa – First Class (O.S.)
- Companion of the Order of Samoa – Second Class (C.O.S.)
- Order of Merit (O.M.)
- Officer of the Order of Samoa – Third Class (O.S.)
- Member of the Order of Samoa – Fourth Class (M.S.)
- Head of State's Service Order (H.S.S.O.)
- Head of State's Service Medal (H.S.S.M.)

Awards for Bravery and Gallantry

- Malietoa Cross (M.C.)
- Samoa Cross (S.C.)
- Samoa Medal of Honour (S.M.H.)
- Head of State's Medal for Valour (H.S.M.V.)

As of 2023, none of the bravery awards have ever been awarded.
