= Faleasiu =

Faleasi'u
- Village district
- Location within Samoa
- Coordinates: 13°48′26″S 171°55′42″W
- Country: Samoa
- District: A'ana

Population (2016)
  - Total: 4,177
- Time zone: -11
- Faleasi'u includes sub-villages Safee, Sapulu, Lealalii, Moamoa, Tauo'o

Faleasi'u is one of the largest village settlements on the island of Upolu in Samoa. It is located on the northwestern coast of the island and has a population of 4177.

Faleasi'u is part of A'ana Alofi 1 Electoral Constituency (Faipule District) which forms the larger political district of A'ana.

Faleasi'u consists of five sub-villages pito nu'u: Safee, Sapulu, Lealalii, Moamoa, and Tauo'o.

The Samoan historian Teo Tuvale (1855–1919) was born in Faleasiu. Tuvale's father, Vaaelua Petaia (1822–1881) was the first pastor in the village. Petaia was one of the first Samoan Christian converts to the London Missionary Society and an early student at Malua Theological College. Following Petaia's death in 1881, his son Faleto'ese became the second pastor in the village. Petaia's father was from Lalomalava on the island of Savai'i.
