= Samoa College =

School in Vaivase, Upolu island, Samoa

Coordinates: 13.849°S 171.749°W

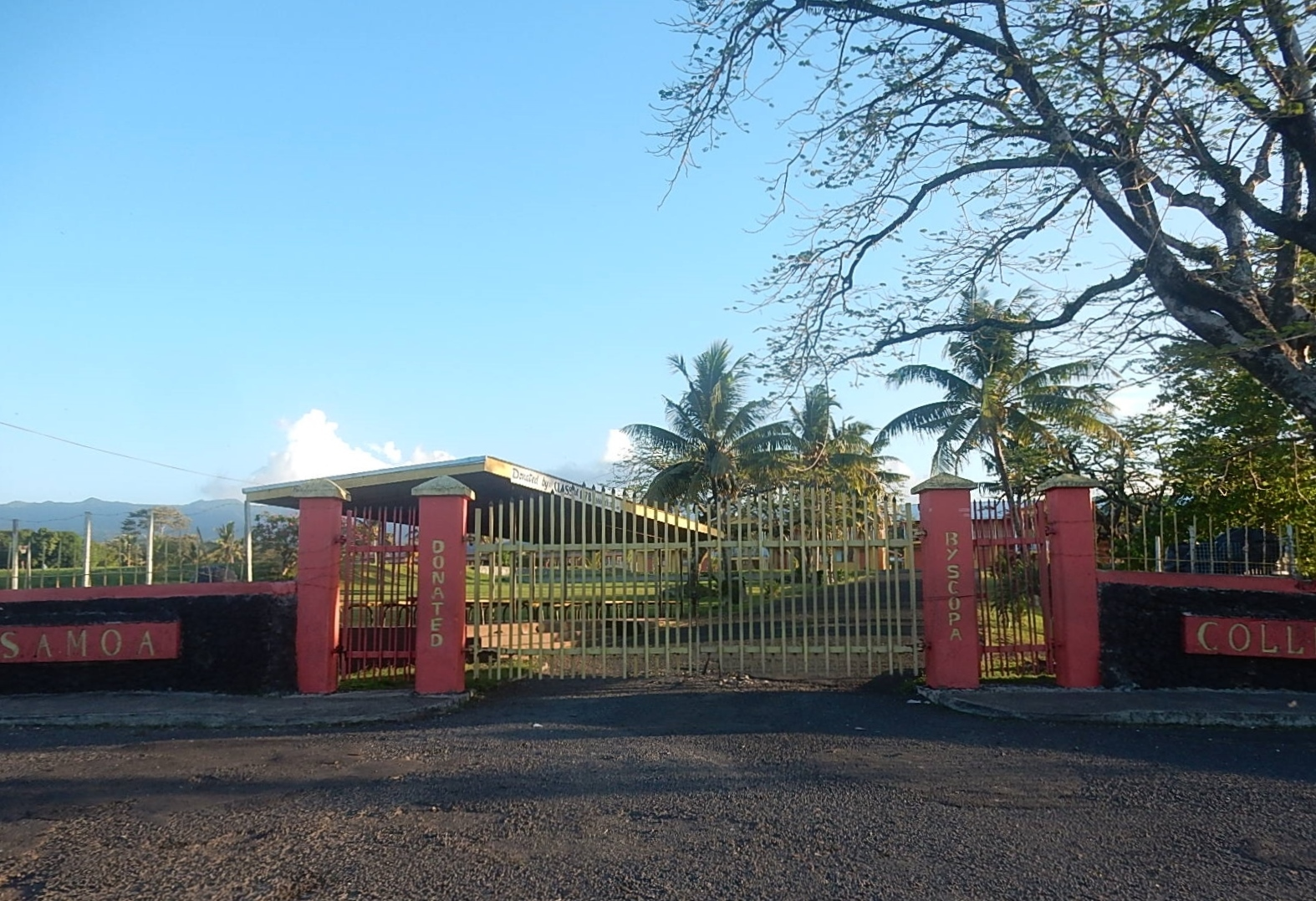
Samoa College, 2016

Samoa College is a secondary school in Samoa officially opened in 1953. It is co-educational and teaches from years 9 to 13. It is in Apia on the island of Upolu and is considered the main college in the country. The early college and curriculum was modeled on secondary schools in New Zealand, reflecting the country's colonial history.

Education in Samoa is overseen by the government's Ministry of Education, Sports and Culture.

== History ==
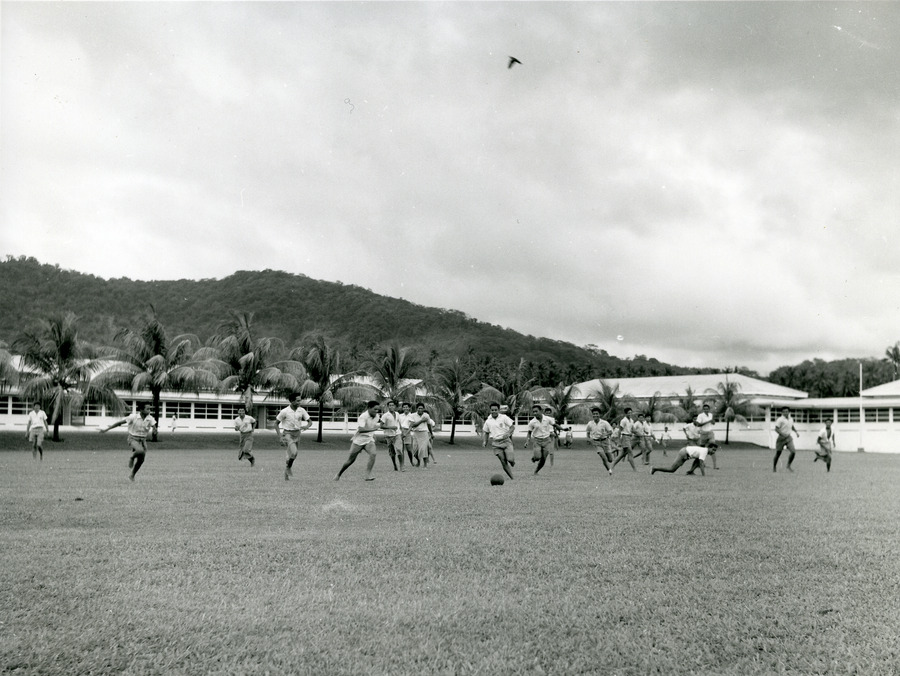
Boys playing football

The college was officially opened on 2 October 1953 by Charles E Beeby, the New Zealand Minister of Education. Samoa's education system is historically associated with New Zealand.

Before the official opening of Samoa College, a system of 'accelerated' learning was developed in 1949 for selected pupils with top marks in exams from around the country. These pupils would make up the core of the new college. The accelerated pupils went to school at a fale in Malifa, near the capital Apia and later moved to the new school once it was opened.

Former students include writer Albert Wendt who became the school principal 1969 to 1973. His tenure saw the broadening of the curriculum to include arts subjects.

== Alumni ==
- Eti Saaga (1970), Samoan poet
- Savea Sano Malifa, journalist and writer
- Le Mamea Ropati, politician
- Sapa'u Ruperake Petaia, poet
- Steffi Carruthers, tennis player
- Jeya Wilson, political activist and NGO leader
