= Ala'alatoa =

Ala'alatoa is a surname. Notable people with the surname include:

- Allan Alaalatoa (born 1994), Australian rugby union player
- Barbara Ala'alatoa, New Zealand Samoan school principal
- Harlan Ala'alatoa (born 1988), Australian rugby union player
- Michael Alaalatoa (born 1991), Australian rugby union player
- Vili Alaalatoa (born 1962), Samoan rugby union player
