= Alaalatoa =

Alaalatoa or Ala'alatoa, when spelled with Samoan diacritics, is a Samoan surname. Notable people with the name include:

- Vili Alaalatoa (born 1962), Samoan rugby union player
- Allan Alaalatoa (born 1994), Australian rugby union player, son of Vili
- Harlan Ala'alatoa (born 1988), Australian rugby league footballer
- Michael Alaalatoa (born 1991), Australian rugby union player, brother of Allan
