= 2014 Birthday Honours (New Zealand) =

Awards list for New Zealand

2014 Queen's Birthday Honours
- Previous: 2014 Special Honours; Next: 2014 bravery awards
- Type: New Zealand royal honours: Order of New Zealand; New Zealand Order of Merit; Queen's Service Order; Queen's Service Medal; Distinguished Service Decoration
- Date: 2 June 2014
- Country: New Zealand

Highlights
- Total recipients: 180

The 2014 Queen's Birthday Honours in New Zealand, celebrating the official birthday of Queen Elizabeth II, were appointments made by the Queen in her right as Queen of New Zealand, on the advice of the New Zealand government, to various orders and honours to reward and highlight good works by New Zealanders. They were announced on 2 June 2014.

The recipients of honours are listed here as they were styled before their new honour.

== Order of New Zealand (ONZ) ==
Ordinary member

- Sir Ronald Powell Carter KNZM – of Auckland. For services to New Zealand.
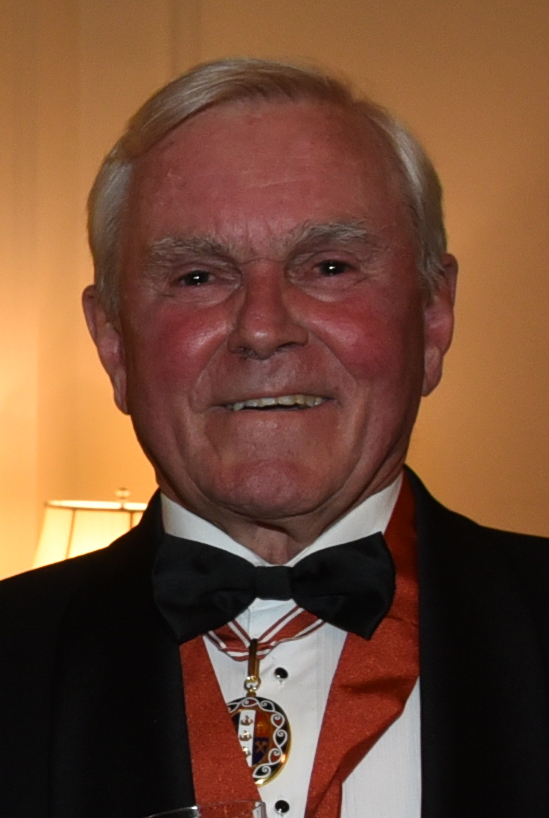
Sir Ron Carter

== New Zealand Order of Merit ==
=== Dame Companion (DNZM) ===
- The Honourable Susan Gwynfa Mary Glazebrook – of Wellington. For services to the judiciary.
- The Honourable Lowell Patria Goddard QC – of Wellington. For services to the law.
- Patricia Lee Reddy – of Wellington. For services to the arts and business.
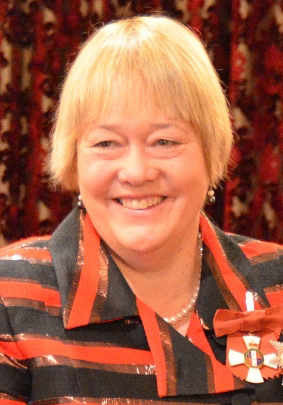
Dame Susan Glazebrook

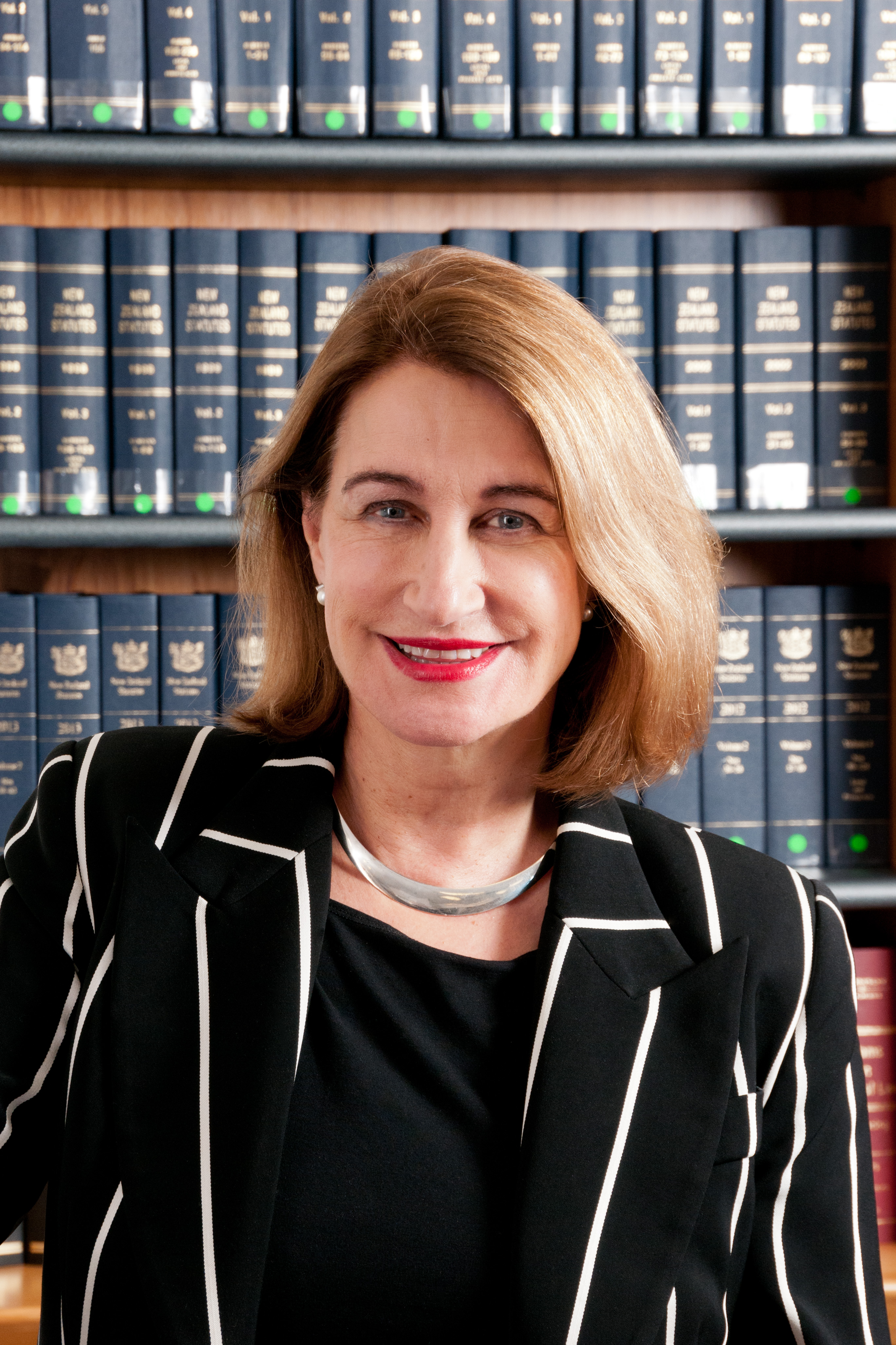
Dame Lowell Goddard

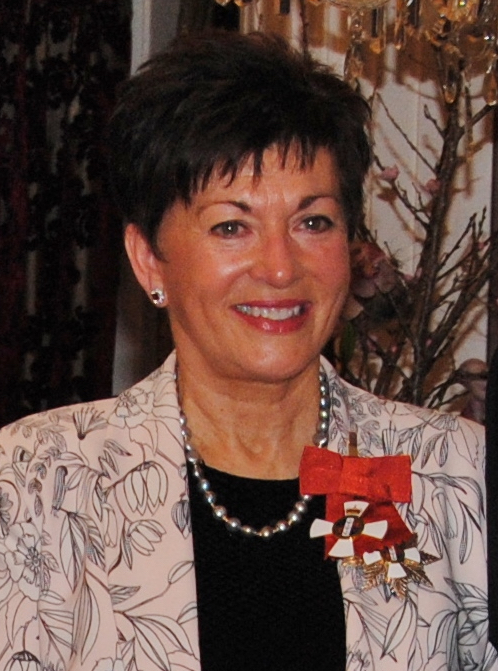
Dame Patsy Reddy

=== Knight Companion (KNZM) ===
- Graeme Seton Avery ONZM – of Hastings. For services to business and sport.
- Richard John Hayes MNZM – of Te Anau. For services to Search and Rescue and the community.
- Dr John Antony Hood – of Shipton-under-Wychwood, United Kingdom. For services to tertiary education.
- Robert John Stewart ONZM – of Christchurch. For services to manufacturing and the community.
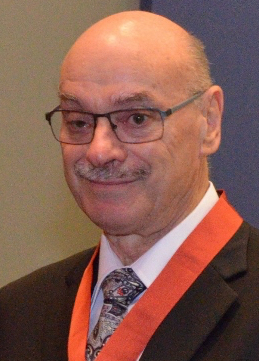
Sir Graeme Avery

Sir Richard Hayes

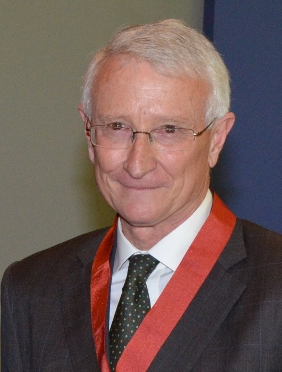
Sir John Hood

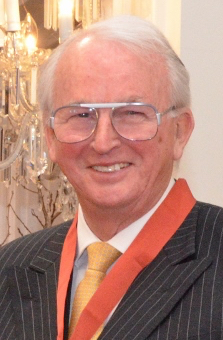
Sir Robert Stewart

=== Companion (CNZM) ===
- The Honourable Rodney Harold Hansen QC – of Auckland. For services to the judiciary.
- Professor Graham Stephen Le Gros – of Wellington. For services to science and medicine.
- Professor Jonathan Ngarimu Mane-Wheoki – of Auckland. For services to the arts.
- Peter Brendon Marshall MNZM – of Auckland. For services to the New Zealand Police and the community.
- Distinguished Professor Graham Hingangaroa Smith – of Whakatāne. For services to Māori and education.
- Dr Warren Henry Tucker – of Carterton. For services to the State.
- Dr Huirangi Eruera Waikerepuru – of New Plymouth. For services to Māori.
- Dr Paul Robert White – of Auckland. For services to children's health and radiology.
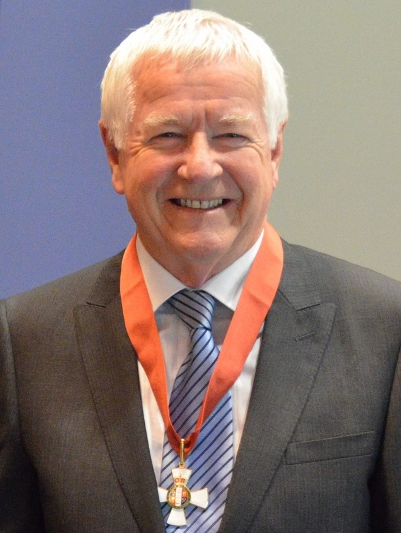
Rodney Hansen

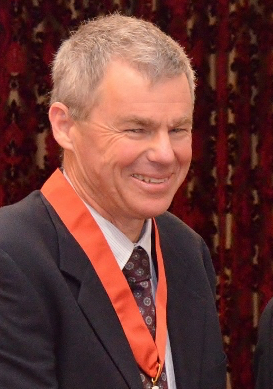
Graham Le Gros

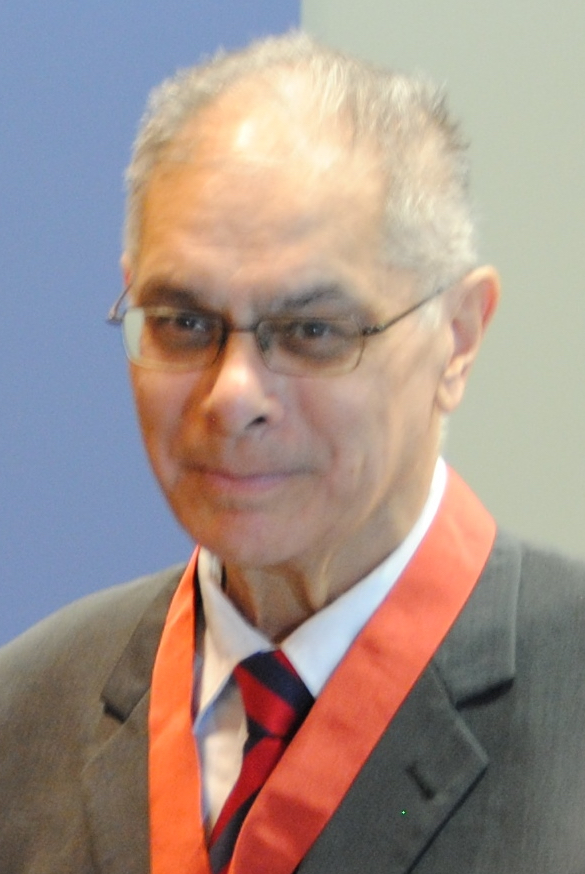
Jonathan Mane-Wheoki

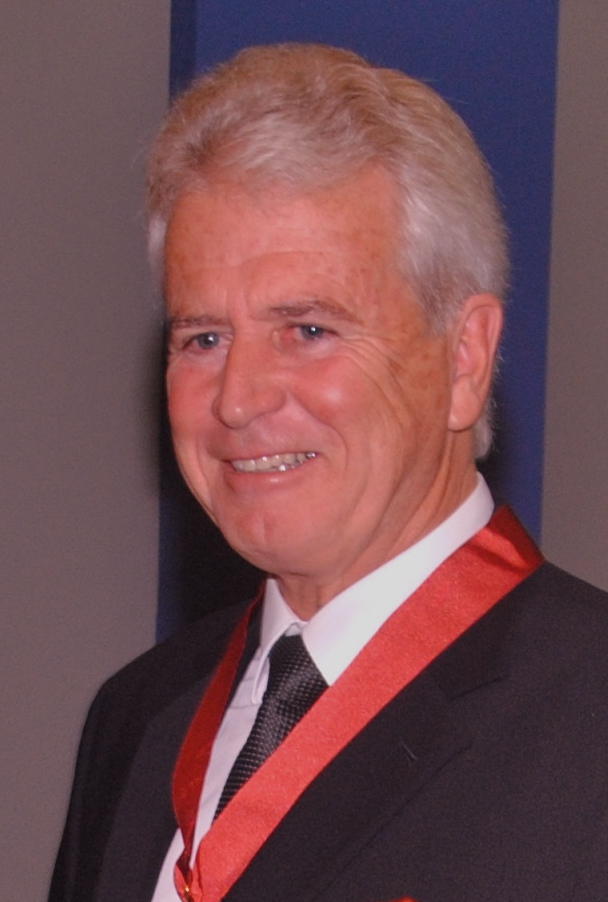
Peter Marshall

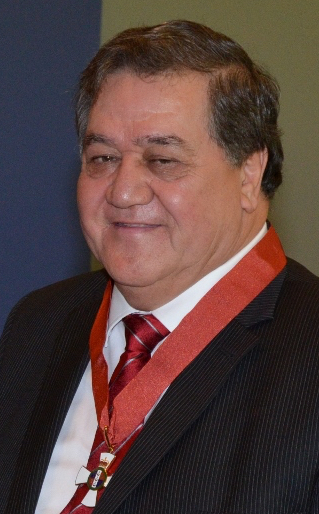
Graham Smith

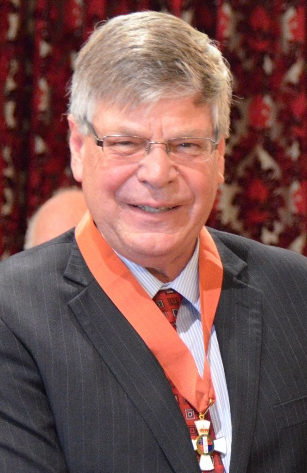
Warren Tucker

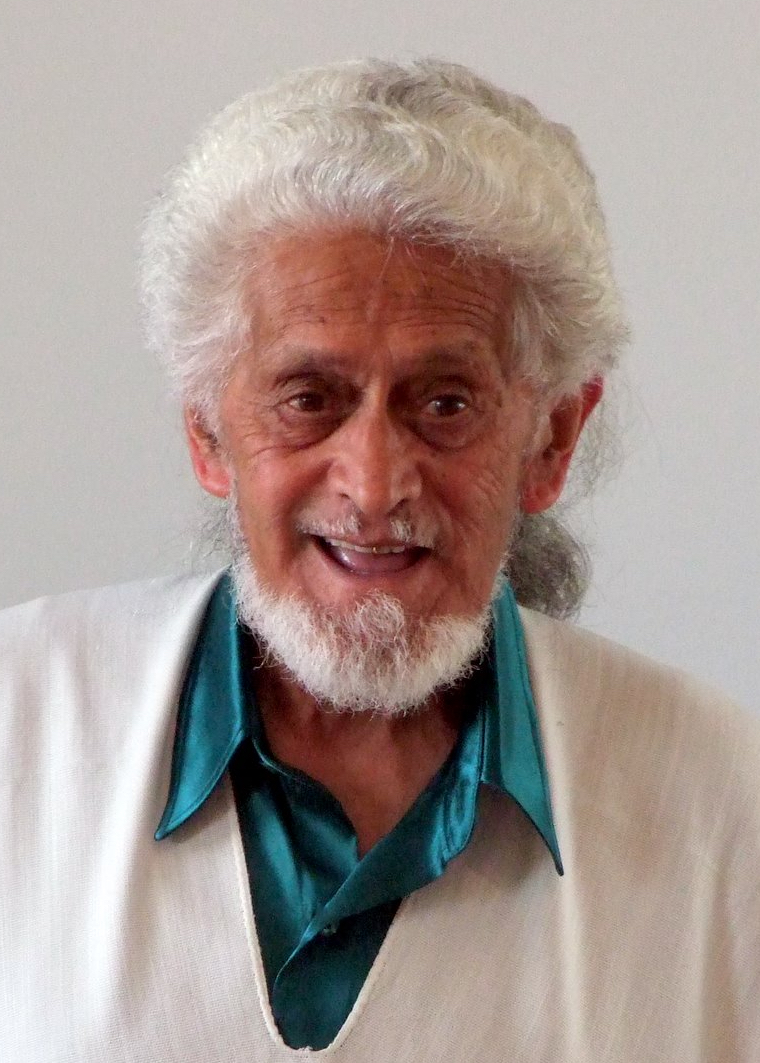
Te Huirangi Waikerepuru

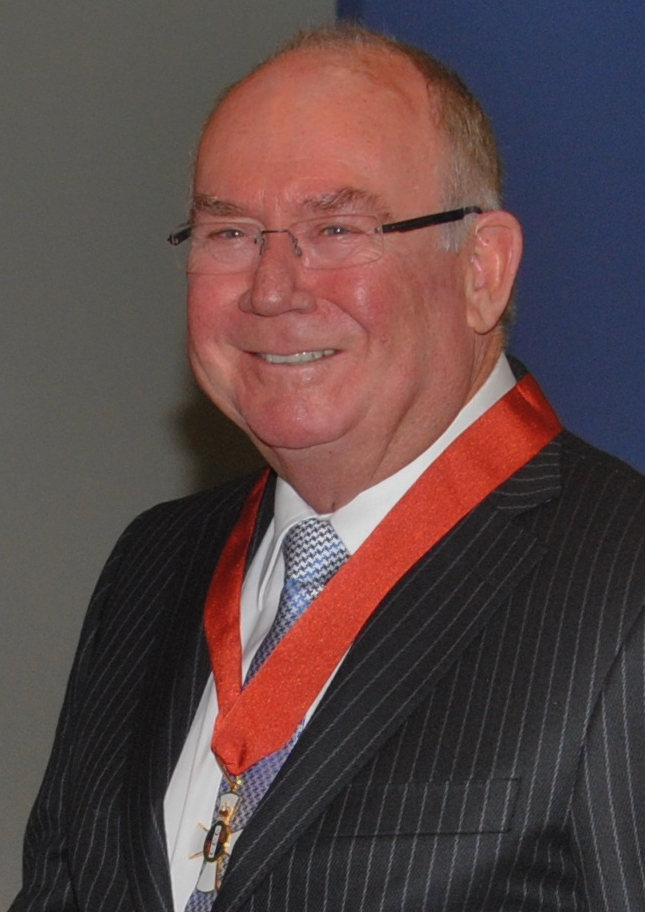
Paul White

=== Officer (ONZM) ===
- Norah Kathleen Barlow – of Wellington. For services to business.
- Rodney Arthur Bell – of Auckland. For services to youth.
- Dr Francis Dion Boffa – of Waikanae. For services to landscape architecture.
- Duncan Athol Butcher – of Cromwell. For services to local government and the community.
- Paul Ashton Campbell – of Auckland. For services to the New Zealand Customs Service.
- William Anthony Caughey – of Auckland. For services to education and business.
- Alan Edgar Chester – of Auckland. For services to sport.
- Roderick James Cooper – of Taupō. For services to local government.
- Adjunct Professor Kenneth Raymond Daniels – of Christchurch. For services to health.
- Catherine Helen Fitzgerald – of Wellington. For services to film.
- Cyril Edwin Hayes – of Milton. For services to local government.
- Riki Herengitana-Cherrington JP – of Invercargill. For services to Māori and education.
- Ian Francis Kearney – of Nelson. For services to business and the community.
- Rangitane Marsden – of Whangārei. For services to Māori.
- Lynn Jean McKenzie – of Wellington. For services to women.
- Donald John Miskell – of Christchurch. For services to landscape architecture.
- Kataraina O'Brien – of Tauranga. For services to Māori and the community.
- Samuel Phillips (Haami Piripi) – of Kaitaia. For services to Māori.
- Professor Michael John Nigel Priestley – of Christchurch. For services to structural engineering.
- Leslie Probert – of Hawke's Bay. For services to local government and the community.
- Geoffrey Charles Robinson – of Lower Hutt. For services to public broadcasting.
- Distinguished Professor Viviane Marcelle Joan Robinson – of Auckland. For services to education.
- Darren Shand – of Christchurch. For services to rugby.
- Kathleen Heather Smith – of Auckland. For services to people with arthritis.
- Air Vice-Marshal Peter James Stockwell AFC RNZAF (Rtd) – of Hamilton. For services to the New Zealand Defence Force.
- Andrew Te Awaitaia Thompson – of Morrinsville. For services to Māori.
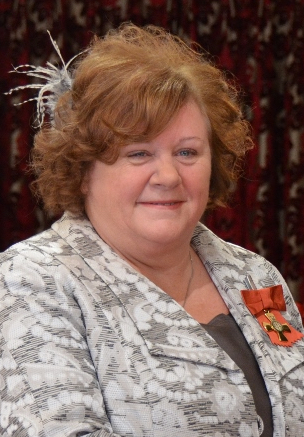
Norah Barlow

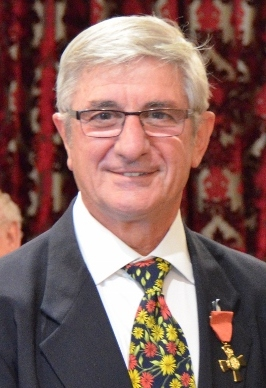
Frank Boffa

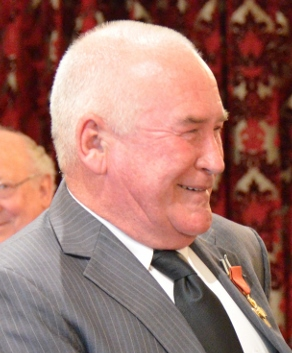
Rick Cooper

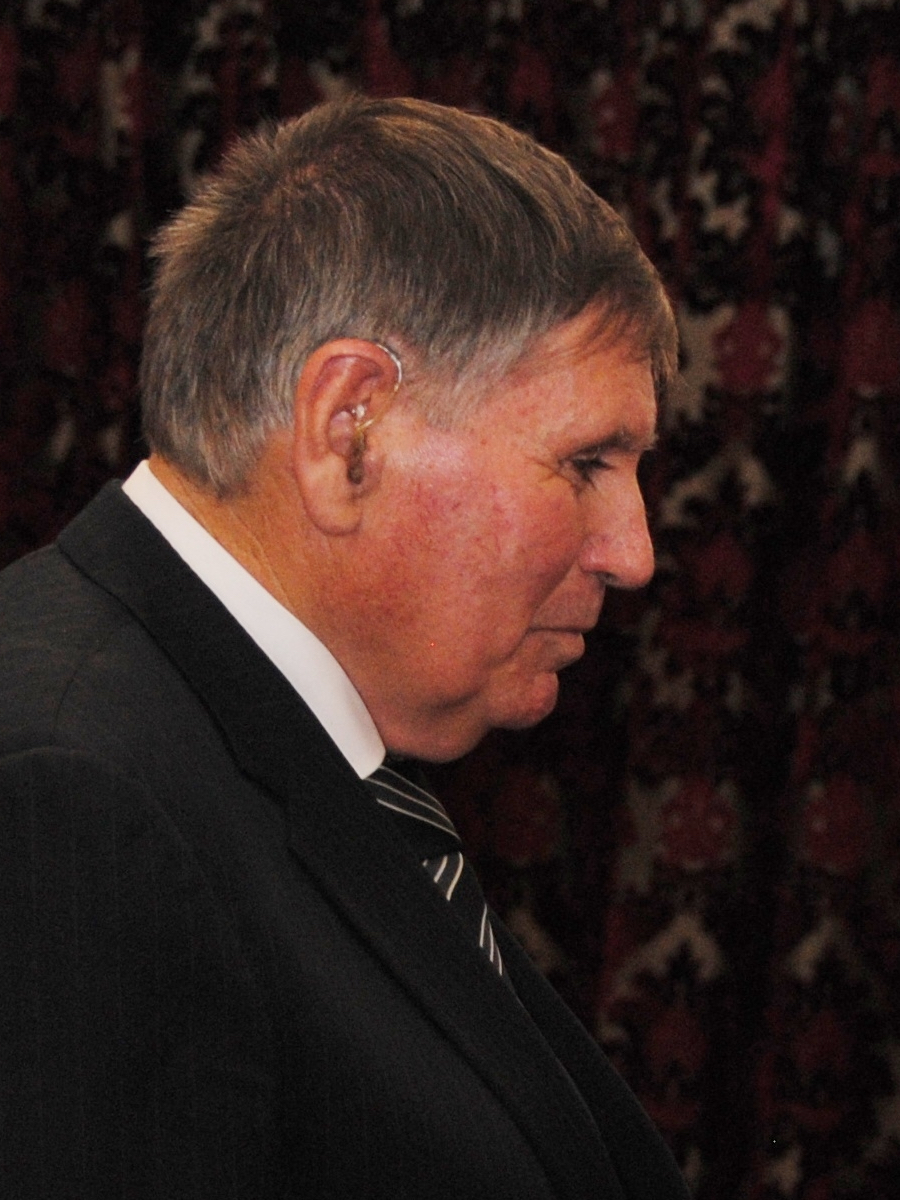
Juno Hayes

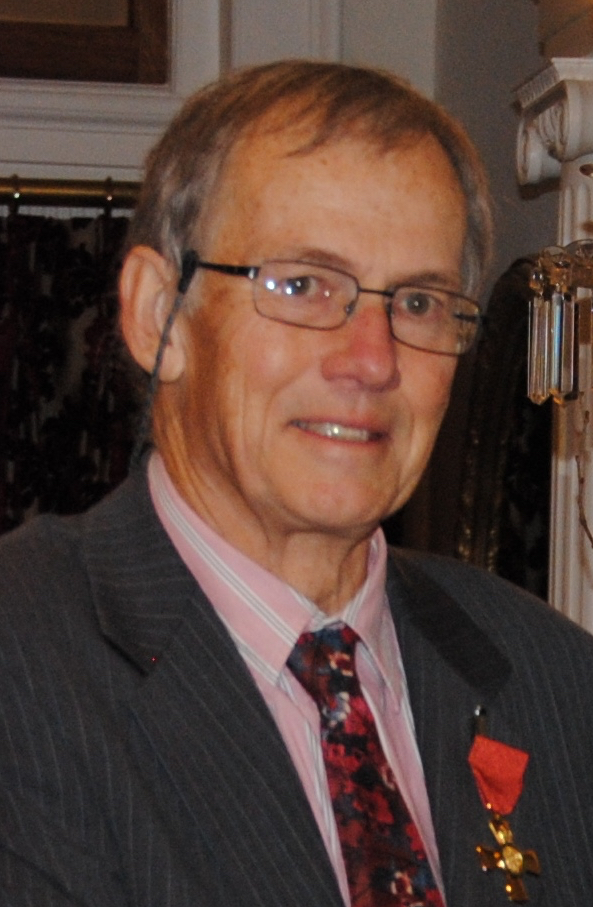
Nigel Priestley

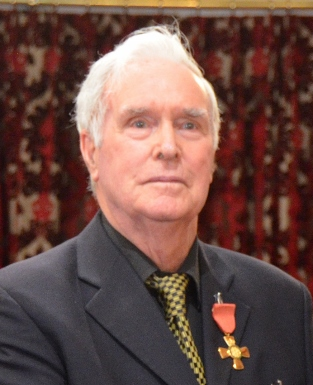
Les Probert

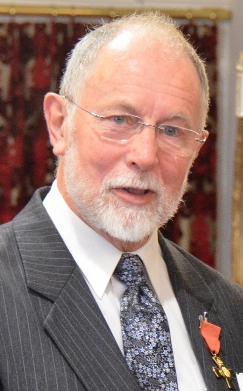
Geoff Robinson

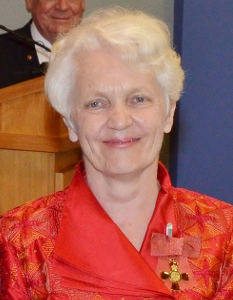
Viviane Robinson

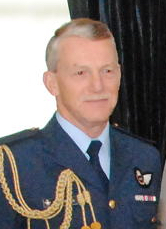
Peter Stockwell

=== Member (MNZM) ===
- Barbara Ala'alatoa – of Auckland. For services to education.
- David O'Brien Baker JP – of Masterton. For services to agribusiness and the community.
- Amanda Jane Baragwanath – of Auckland. For services to people with disabilities.
- Fergus Barrowman – of Wellington. For services to publishing.
- Jennifer Margery Black – of Nelson. For services to health.
- Dillon Matthew Boucher – of Auckland. For services to basketball.
- Melba Clare Brajkovich – of Auckland. For services to the wine industry and the community.
- Marie Therese Brown – of Wellington. For services to music.
- Donald Murray Douglas Cleverley – of Timaru. For services to business and the community.
- Joanna Edwards – of Nelson. For services to lawn bowls.
- Vanessa Jonella Eparaima – of Rotorua. For services to Māori.
- Maliaga Toloaki Erick – of Auckland. For services to the Pacific community and health.
- Betty Gilderdale – of Auckland. For services to children's literature.
- Miri Amiria Hawiki – of Lower Hutt. For services to Māori.
- Dr Virginia Hope – of Wellington. For services to health.
- Paul Richard Hudson JP – of Port Chalmers. For services to business and the community.
- Bryan John Jackson JP – of Waikanae. For services to the motor industry and the community.
- Edwin Kohlhase – of Auckland. For services to softball.
- Detective Senior Sergeant Gary Raymond Lendrum – of Papakura. For services to the New Zealand Police and the community.
- Bridget Mary Liddell – of Auckland. For services to business.
- Colleen Marshall – of Nelson. For services to the arts.
- Waihaere Mason – of Nelson. For services to Māori.
- Professor Donald Maurice – of Wellington. For services to music.
- Peter John Wilson McClure – of Auckland. For services to business and philanthropy.
- David William Meates – of Christchurch. For services to health.
- Christopher Philip Mules – of Auckland. For services to health.
- Rachel Noble – of Wellington. For services to the deaf.
- Helen Henrietta Pope – of Ashburton. For services to harness racing.
- Marie Bernadette Quinn – of Auckland. For services to business and the community.
- Dr Anthony Ansley Ruakere – of New Plymouth. For services to Māori health.
- Professor Elaine Carolyn Rush – of Auckland. For services to health.
- James Alan Sadler – of Masterton. For services to the community.
- David Stewart Scott JP – of Gisborne. For services to the community.
- Robyn Scott-Vincent – of Auckland. For services to television and people with disabilities.
- Deryck Jonathan Shaw – of Rotorua. For services to the community.
- Glenn Charles Smith – of Whakatāne. For services as a broadcaster.
- Murray James Spearman – of Auckland. For services to business and the community.
- Francis McDonald Stark – of Wellington. For services to film.
- Dr Surinder Kumar Tandon – of Lincoln. For services to the community and textile science.
- Bevan Maihi Taylor – of Hastings. For services to Māori.
- Gail Valmai Thomson – of Auckland. For services to education.
- Ian Russell Tucker – of Nelson. For services to Search and Rescue.
- Te Iria Marama Whiu – of Tauranga. For services to Māori and education.
- Catriona Ruth Williams – of Masterton. For services to spinal cord injury research.
- Dr Grant Victor McLelland Williams – of Upper Hutt. For services to science.

Honorary

- Dr Lesieli Pelesikoti Tongati'o – of Palmerston North. For services to education and the Pacific community.
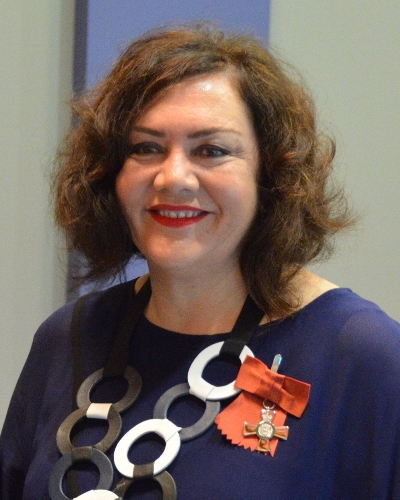
Barbara Ala'alatoa

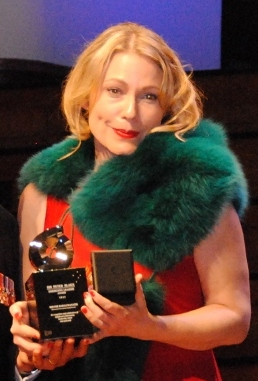
Minnie Baragwanath

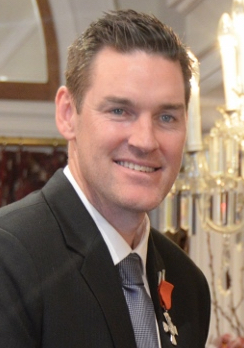
Dillon Boucher

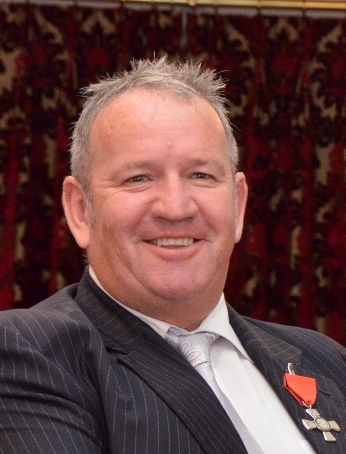
Murray Cleverley

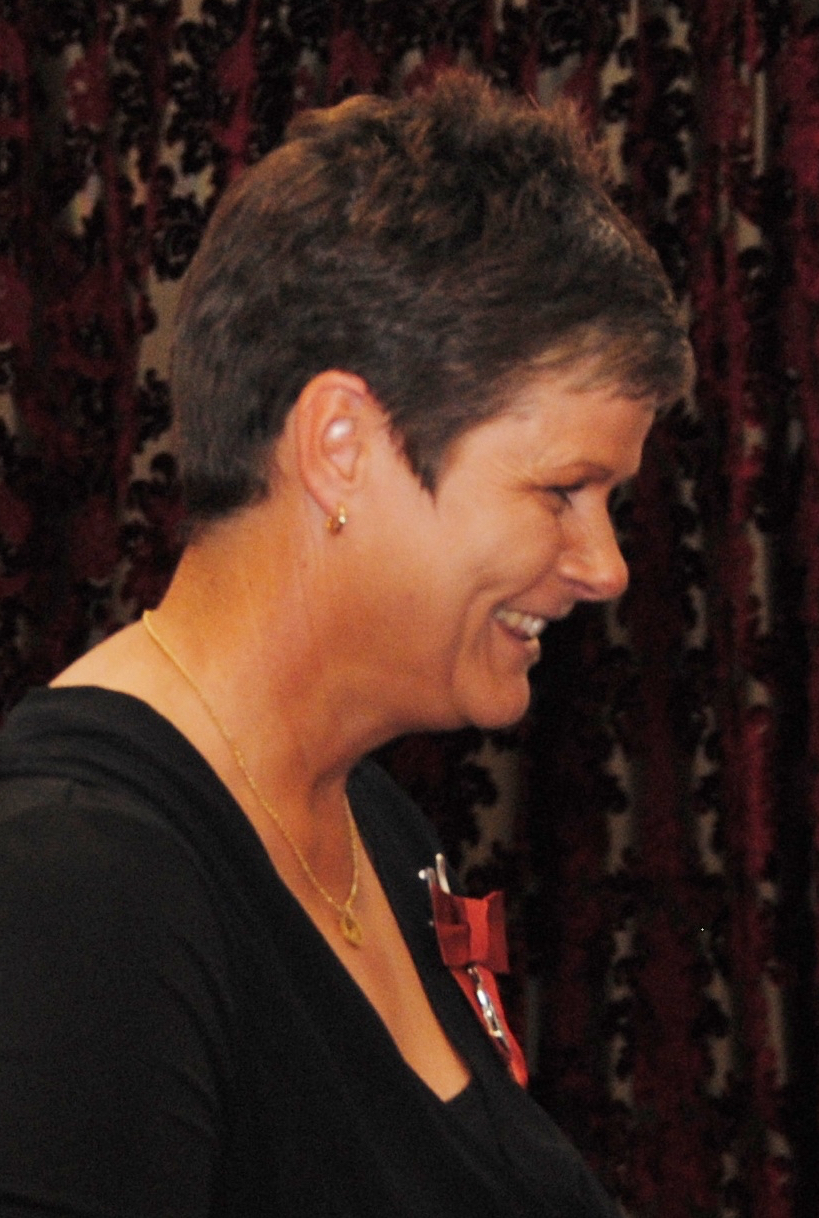
Jo Edwards

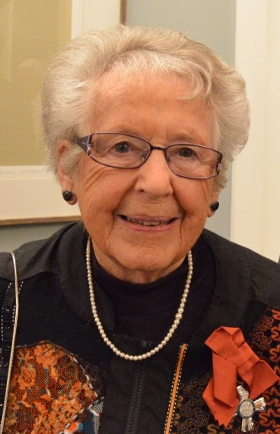
Betty Gilderdale

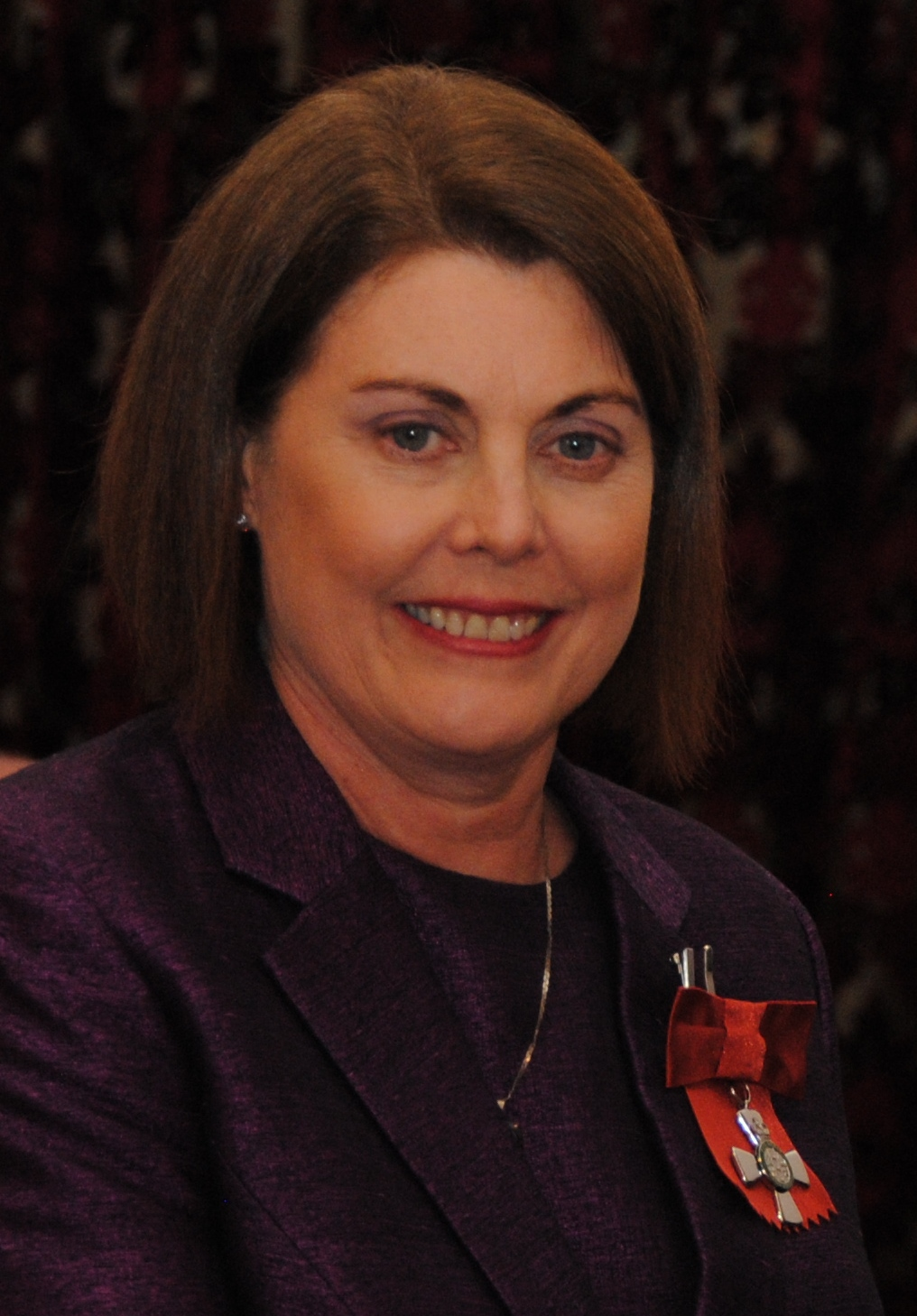
Virginia Hope

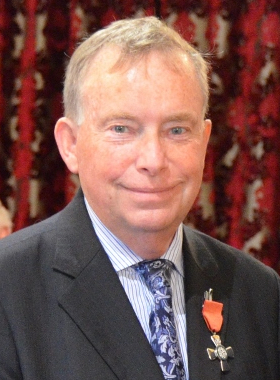
Paul Hudson

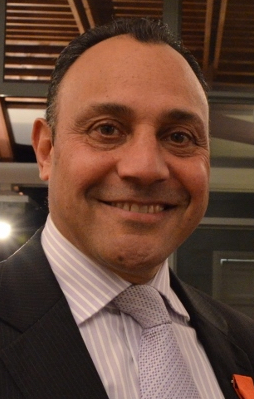
Eddie Kohlhase

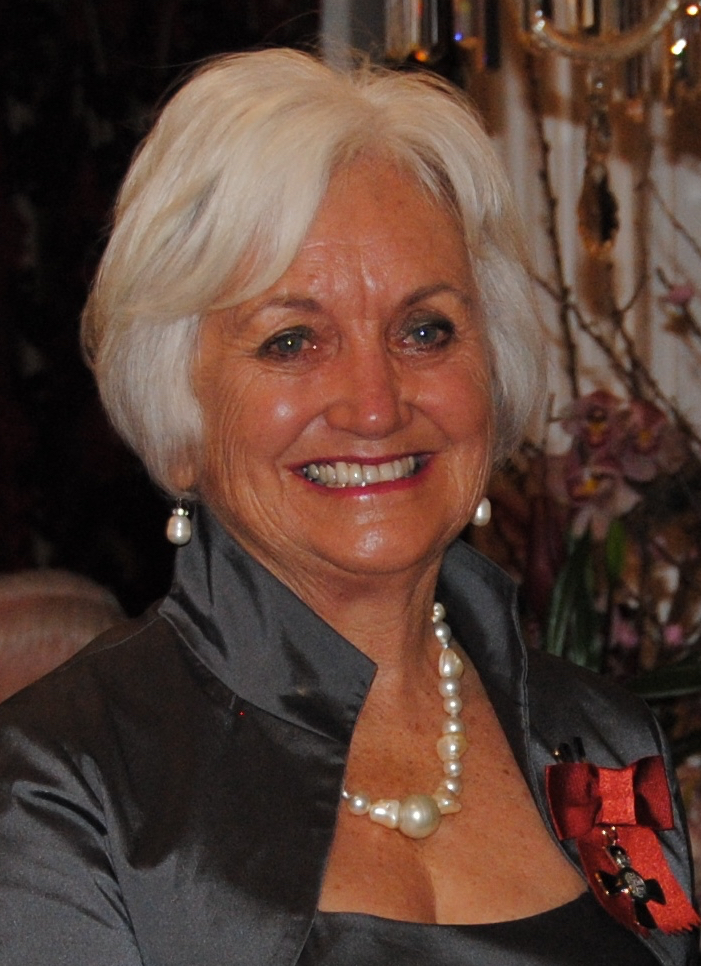
Colleen Marshall

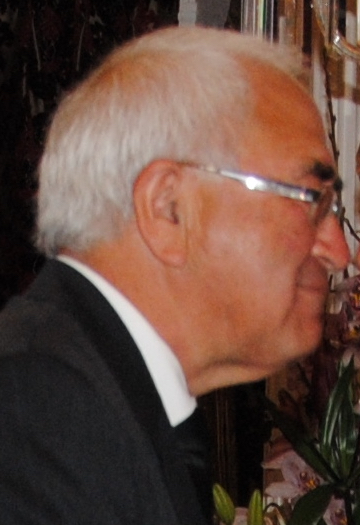
Waihaere Mason

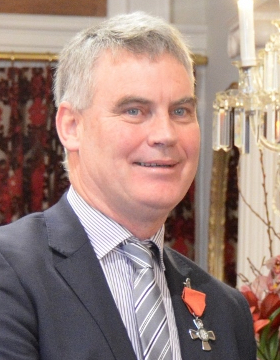
David Meates

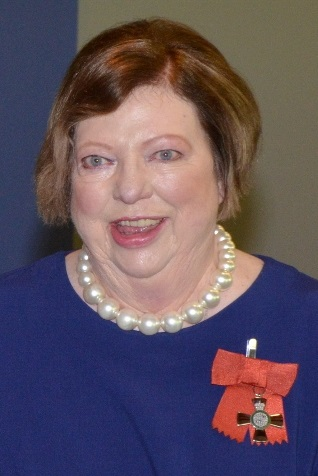
Marie Quinn

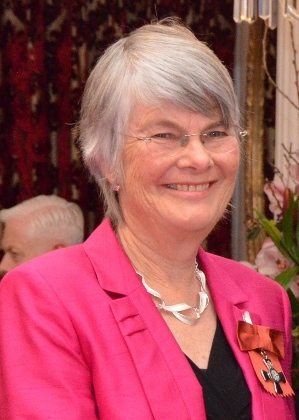
Elaine Rush

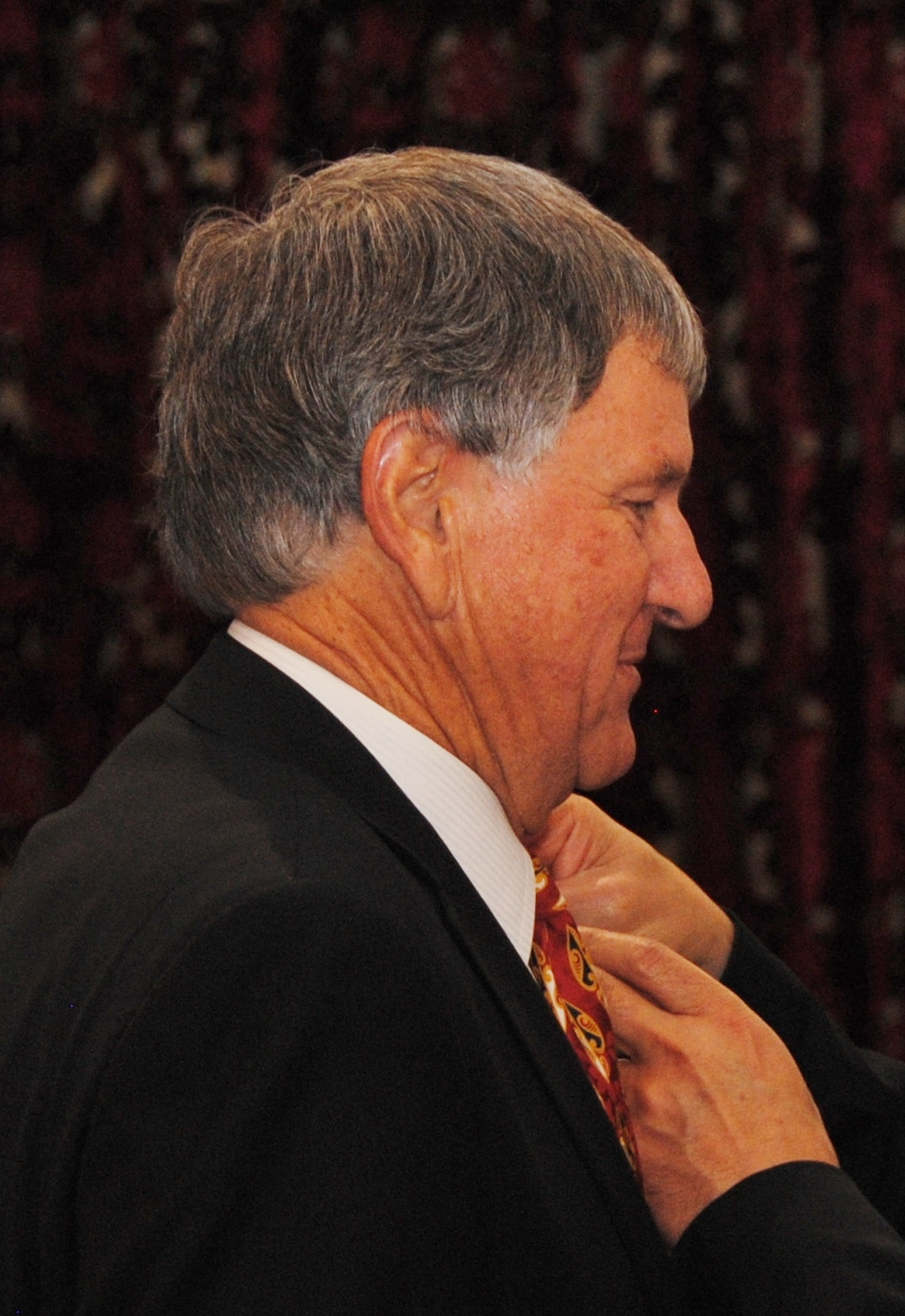
David Scott

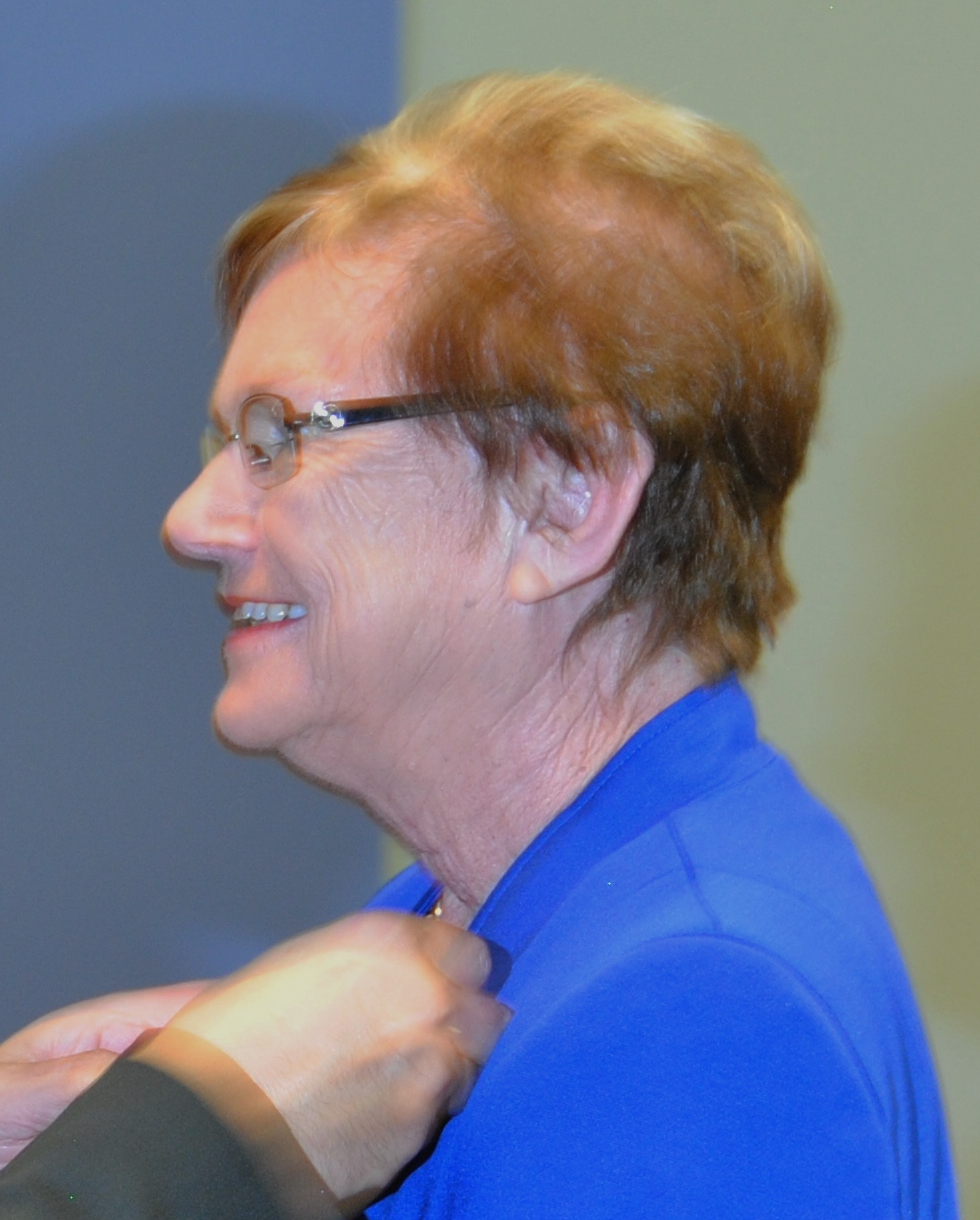
Gail Thomson

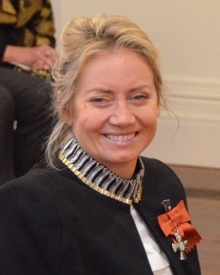
Catriona Williams

== Companion of the Queen's Service Order (QSO) ==
- Roy Neil Ferguson – of Wellington. For services to the State.
- Judge Jeremy Philip Gittos – of Auckland. For services to the judiciary.
- Judge Shonagh Ellen Kenderdine – of Wellington. For services to the judiciary.
- Dr Kim McGregor – of Auckland. For services to the prevention of sexual violence.
- Judge David Fergus George Sheppard – of Melbourne, Australia. For services to the judiciary.
- Dr Graham Charles Stoop – of Paraparaumu. For services to education.
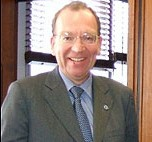
Roy Ferguson

Graham Stoop

== Queen's Service Medal (QSM) ==
- Douglas Terence Archbold JP – of Christchurch. For services to farming and the community.
- Clive Richard Asplin – of Feilding. For services to justice and the community.
- Antony Backhouse – of Auckland. For services to youth and education.
- D'Arcy Lewisham Bailey – of Whangārei. For services to the community.
- Ronald Garth Ballantyne – of Dunedin. For services to education.
- Ann Elizabeth Barsby – of Dunedin. For services to heritage preservation.
- Michael David Barton – of Tūrangi. For services to farming and the environment.
- Janice Barbara Beck – of Napier. For services to music.
- Mark Andrew Benjamin – of Riwaka. For services to people with disabilities.
- Alistair George Boyce – of Picton. For services to education.
- Alistair Bruce Buchanan – of Paeroa. For services to the community.
- Ian Charles Cameron JP – of Marlborough. For services to the community.
- Peter John Chambers – of Waipukurau. For services to the Royal New Zealand Returned and Services' Association.
- Weng Kei Chen – of Christchurch. For services to ethnic communities.
- Michael David Christensen JP – of Tauranga. For services to business and the community.
- John Oliver Coffey – of Christchurch. For services to sports journalism and history.
- John David Collings – of Taihape. For services to the New Zealand Fire Service and the community.
- Tony Noel Collings – of Taihape. For services to the New Zealand Fire Service and the community.
- Kevin John Conroy – of Carterton. For services to justice.
- Margaret Jane Coughlan – of Timaru. For services to the community.
- Eugene James Charles Crosby JP – of Wellington. For services to the community.
- Kathleen Deady – of Auckland. For services to education.
- Brenda Joyce Donovan – of Bluff. For services to seafarers.
- Paul Ronald Downie – of Great Barrier Island. For services to the community.
- Ian Donald Dymock – of Featherston. For services to the Merchant Navy.
- Piripo Elisaia – of Auckland. For services to the Pacific community.
- Fereni Pepe Ete – of Wellington. For services to the Pacific community and education.
- Colleen Margaret Freitas – of Hokitika. For services to senior citizens and the community.
- Philip Humphrey Garland – of Waikato. For services to folk music.
- Christopher Russell Grace – of Hunterville. For services to racing and the community.
- Corinne Hansell – of Auckland. For services to education.
- John Michael Harman – of Eketāhuna. For services to the community.
- John Robert Lloyd Harwood – of Brightwater. For services to the community.
- Donald Gordon Heslop – of Leeston. For services to the community and photography.
- David Hughes – of Gisborne. For services to Search and Rescue and scouting.
- Ian Charles Hunter – of Gisborne. For services to education.
- Sun-Ha Hwang JP – of Auckland. For services to the Korean community.
- Anthony Albert Israel JP – of Taupō. For services as a justice of the peace.
- Ronald Jack Jones – of Auckland. For services to the rail industry.
- Ruth Miriama Jones – of Christchurch. For services to people with disabilities.
- Alan Andrew Key – of Gore. For services to recreational fishing.
- Choon-Sook Kye – of Auckland. For services to the Korean community.
- Geoffrey Thomas Lovegrove – of Feilding. For services to education.
- James Fredrick Lower JP – of Waikanae. For services to the community.
- James Lum – of Napier. For services to the community.
- Margaret Regine MacBean – of Auckland. For services to education.
- John Welsford Markby – of Whangārei. For services to the community and as a broadcaster.
- James Oliver Mathewson – of Auckland. For services to education.
- Jennifer Shirley Mayer – of Taupō. For services to Girl Guiding and the community.
- Peter Boyd McPherson – of Tapanui. For services to the community.
- Rex Frederick Noble – of Mangaweka. For services to the New Zealand Fire Service.
- Rahera Ohia – of Papamoa. For services to Māori.
- John David Orchard – of Blenheim. For services to heritage preservation.
- Beatrice Ann Parsons – of Wellington. For services to business and the arts.
- Julian Russell Parsons – of Wellington. For services to business and the arts.
- William James Rackham – of Paeroa. For services to the New Zealand Fire Service.
- Shirley Roma Robertson – of Gisborne. For services to the community.
- William Edward Rossiter – of Whangārei. For services to the community.
- Frances Helen Russell JP – of Wellington. For services to the community.
- Walter Douglas Russell JP – of Whitianga. For services to the New Zealand Fire Service.
- Graeme William Sanders – of Ōtorohanga. For services to senior citizens and the community.
- Lealofisa Setefano – of Auckland. For services to education and the Pacific community.
- Donald Robert Shanks – of Whakatāne. For services to the New Zealand Fire Service.
- Antonia Joanne Sharp – of Taupō. For services to the visually impaired.
- Jennifer Robyn Shattock JP – of Tokoroa. For services to the community.
- Karen Annette Sherry – of Auckland. For services to the electricity industry.
- Dr Ian Christopher Smit – of Kaitaia. For services to health.
- Alan Charles Spence – of Whakatāne. For services to brass bands.
- Ailsa Mae Spicer – of Auckland. For services to education and the community.
- Patrick James Sullivan – of Dunedin. For services to broadcasting.
- Sylvia Rina Taylor – of Auckland. For services to the community.
- Heather Te Au Skipworth – of Hastings. For services to athletics and Māori.
- Charmeyne Te Nana-Williams – of Waitakere (West Auckland). For services to people with disabilities.
- Bruce Leonard James True – of Ōpōtiki. For services to the community.
- Eileen Harriet von Dadelszen JP – of Hastings. For services to the community.
- Kevin Warrick Wearne – of Mount Maunganui. For services to the community.
- Colin Leslie Weatherall – of Dunedin. For services to the community.
- Mavis White – of Westport. For services to hockey and the community.
- Paul Derbidge White – of Christchurch. For services to mountain safety and pipe bands.
- Judith Rose Williams – of Auckland. For services to the community.
- Noreen Carol Wright – of Christchurch. For services to senior citizens and the community.
- Jane Amelia Yoong – of Waikanae. For services to senior citizens.

Honorary

- Aufaga Faimai Tuimauga – of Auckland. For services to the Pacific community and education.
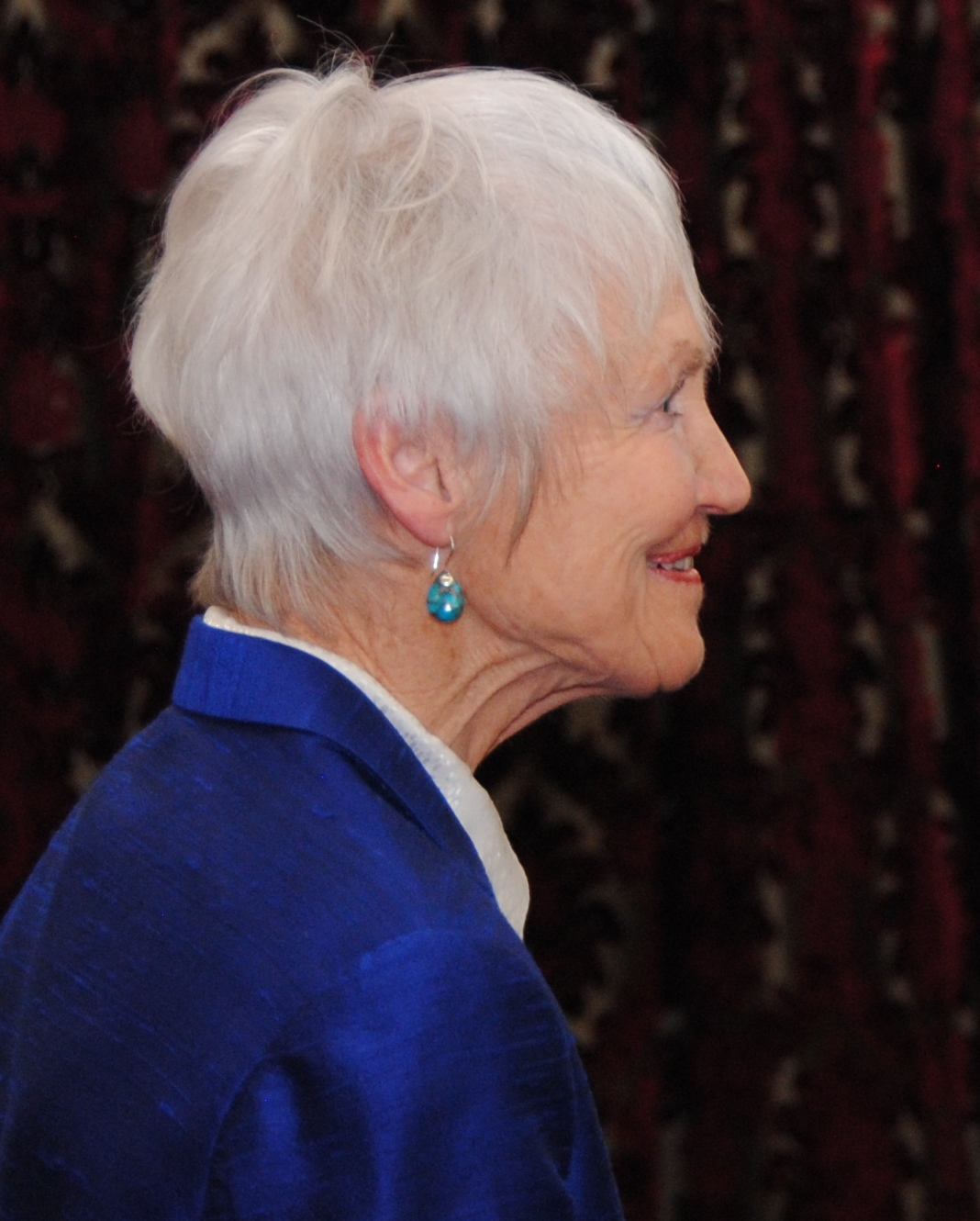
Ann Barsby

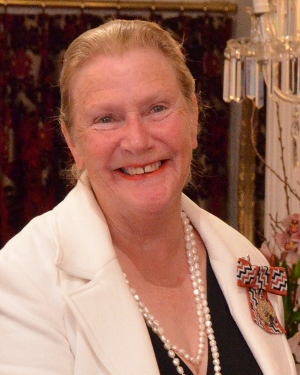
Jane Coughlan

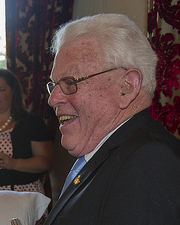
Eugene Crosby

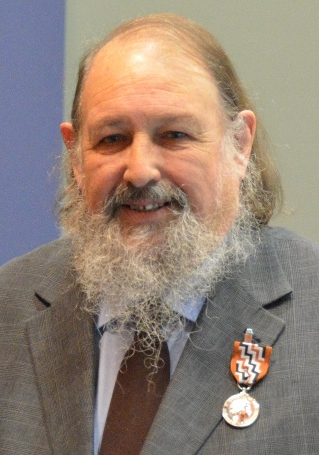
Phil Garland

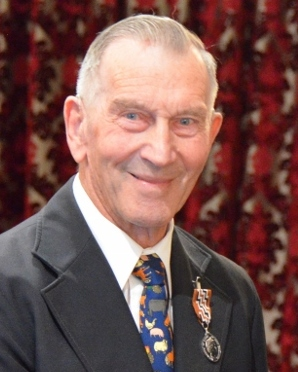
John Harwood

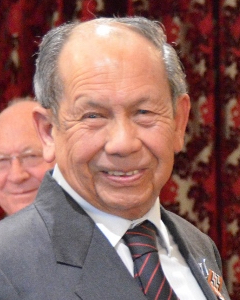
Jim Lum

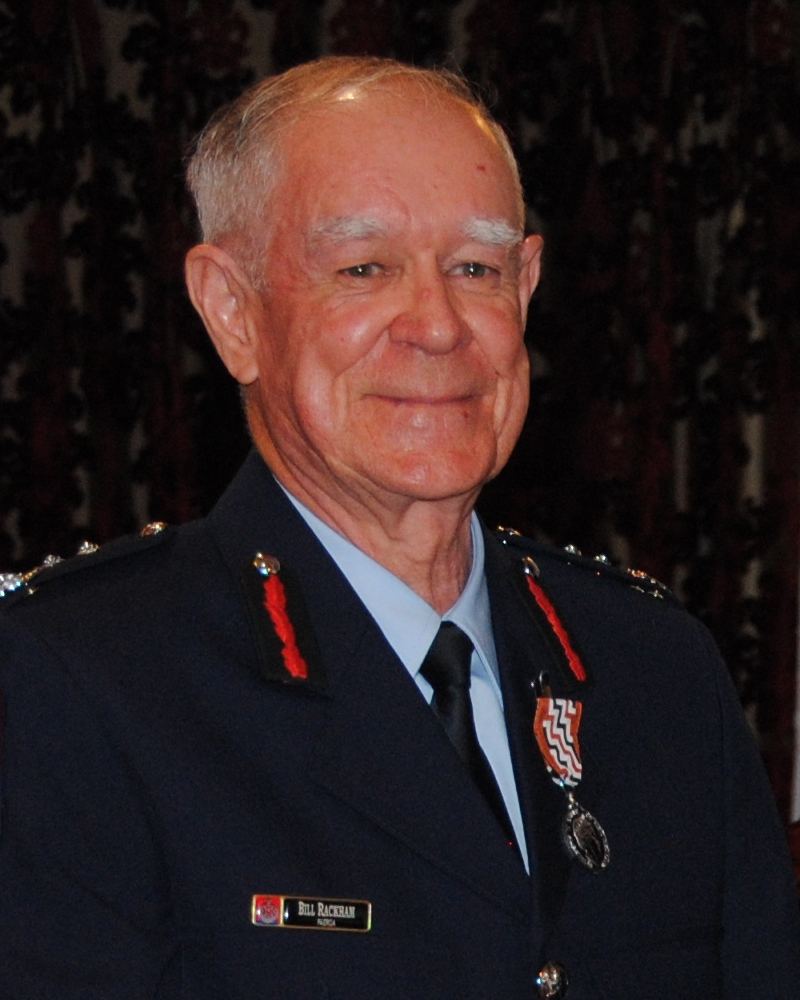
Bill Rackham

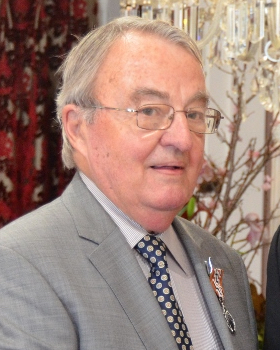
Graeme Sanders

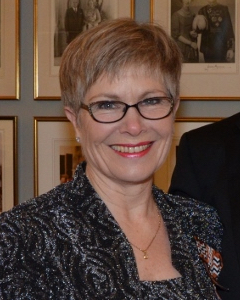
Jenny Shattock

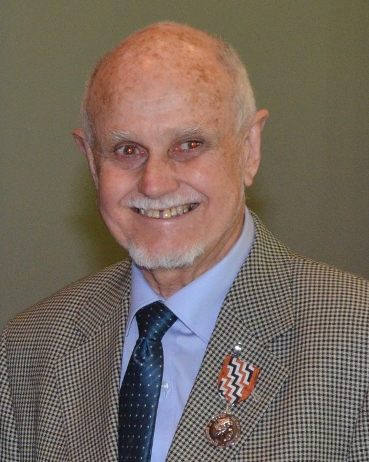
Paul White

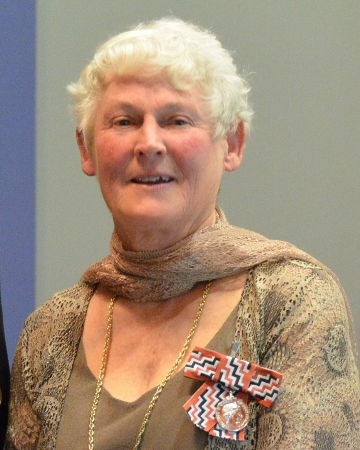
Judith Williams

== New Zealand Distinguished Service Decoration (DSD) ==
- Warrant Officer Richard Clive Henstock – of Auckland. For services to the New Zealand Defence Force.
- Lieutenant Colonel Richard John MacGregor Weston MNZM – of Upper Hutt. For services to the New Zealand Defence Force.
- Captain Dominic Gareth Crosby Wylie – of Christchurch. For services to the New Zealand Defence Force.
