= 2014 Special Honours (New Zealand) =

Awards list for New Zealand

- Previous: 2014 New Year Honours; Next: 2014 bravery awards
- Type: New Zealand royal honours: Royal Victorian Order
- Date: 25 March 2014
- Country: New Zealand

Highlights
- Total recipients: 1

The 2014 Special Honours in New Zealand was a Special Honours List dated 25 March 2014, recognising the service of the outgoing Secretary of the Cabinet and Clerk of the Executive Council.

In addition, two other Special Honours Lists, published on 2 April and 8 December, promulgated the 2014 New Zealand bravery awards and the 2014 New Zealand gallantry awards.

== Royal Victorian Order ==
=== Commander (CVO) ===
- Rebecca Lucy Kitteridge – on relinquishing the role of Secretary of the Cabinet and Clerk of the Executive Council in New Zealand.
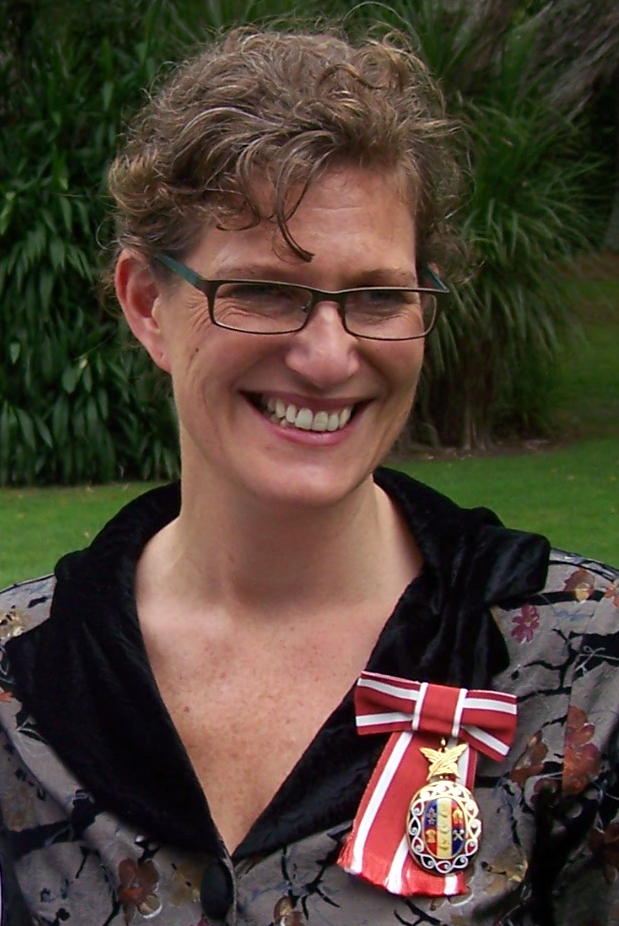
Rebecca Kitteridge
