= Norah Barlow =

New Zealand business executive

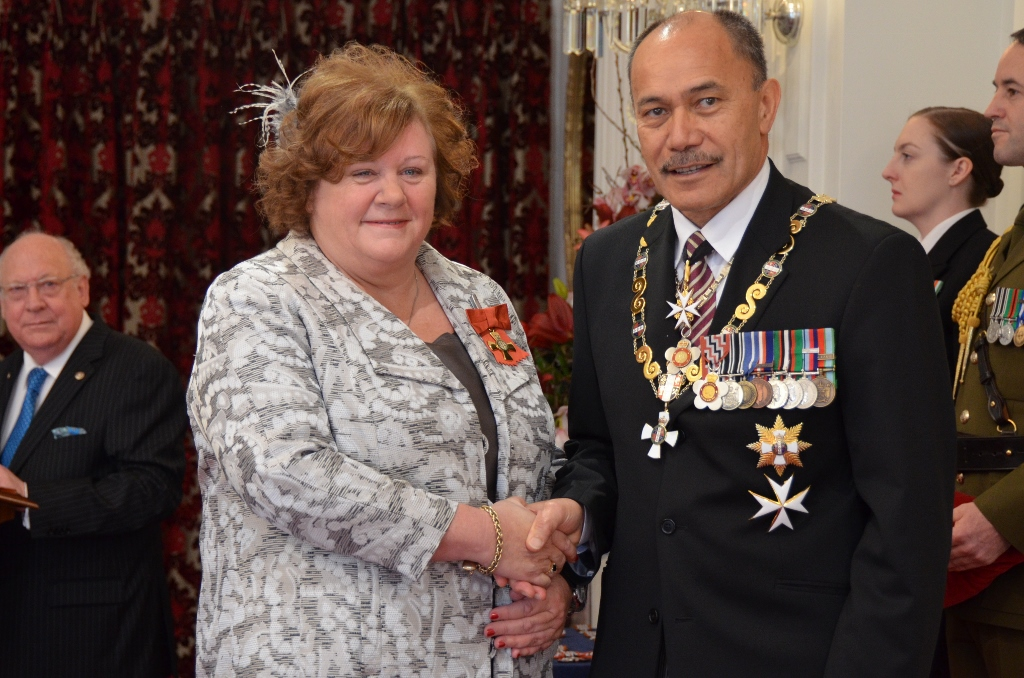
Barlow in 2014, after her investiture as an Officer of the New Zealand Order of Merit by the governor-general, Sir Jerry Mateparae

Norah Kathleen Barlow ONZM (born 1957) is a New Zealand business executive. She was formerly the managing director and chief executive of aged-care business Summerset Group.

== Early life ==
Barlow was born in Liverpool, England, in 1957. Her family emigrated to New Zealand in 1960, settling in Wellington.

Barlow was educated at Victoria University of Wellington. After completing her first year's study full-time, she went on to study part-time while raising her children and working. She worked in taxation at the Inland Revenue Department and New Zealand Guardian Trust, and set up her own accountancy business, Barlow and McCormack, in 1992 which was based in Lower Hutt.

== Career ==
Barlow's firm was hired in 1993 by the founder of Summerset Group, John O'Sullivan, to provide accountancy services. She moved to Summerset full-time in 1999, becoming the group accountant. She became CEO in 2001. In the early years of Summerset, prior to it being first sold to AMP Capital Investors in 2005, Barlow was a minor shareholder in the company.

During her time as CEO, Barlow grew the business from a small network of five villages and two hospitals in the lower North Island to a nationwide group of 17 sites. In 2011 Barlow led the company through the initial public offering (IPO) process on the New Zealand Stock Exchange. When the company was listed, she became one of only two female chief executives of NZX companies, the other being Theresa Gattung of Telecom New Zealand.

During her career, she held the position of president of the Retirement Village Association for seven years. She also chaired the committee that developed the 2008 Code of Practice for retirement villages in New Zealand.

Barlow retired from her position at Summerset at the end of 2013 and remained on the board until 2016 as a director. She holds directorships and advisory positions with a number of business and community organisations, including the Wellington regional netball board, life insurance company Cigna, and retirement community business Ingenia.

Barlow has frequently commented on the unconscious bias of recruitment and promotion that often leads to women being overlooked. She has served on the National Advisory Council on the Employment of Women for the Ministry of Women's Affairs.

In 2016, after 3 years of being retired from a full time corporate role, Barlow became interim then permanent CEO of Estia Healthcare an Australian company she had recently become a director of. In November 2018 she became CEO of Heritage Lifecare.

== Awards and recognition ==
In 2013, Barlow was named Wellingtonian of the Year for business. The same year, she received an award for Most Outstanding Contributor to Over 50s Housing at the Over 50s Housing Awards in London, England. She also received two of the seven Women in Governance Awards in 2013, for Gender Diversity in Leadership and Excellence in Leadership, from the organisation Women on Boards.

In the 2014 Queen’s Birthday Honours, Barlow was appointed an Officer of the New Zealand Order of Merit, for services to business.
