= Richard Hayes (pilot) =

New Zealand helicopter pilot

Hayes in 2007

Sir Richard John Hayes KNZM (born 1951 or 1952) is a New Zealand helicopter pilot. With over 30,000 flying hours, he is among New Zealand's most experienced pilots. He is the CEO of Southern Lakes Helicopters, a helicopter transport provider based in Fiordland.

Hayes grew up in the South Otago town of Milton, but has spent much of his adult life in Te Anau, at the edge of Fiordland National Park. His brother, Juno Hayes, was a local politician who served as the mayor of Clutha for 12 years and was appointed an Officer of the New Zealand Order of Merit in the 2014 Queen's Birthday Honours — the same list in which Richard was knighted. Richard's nickname, "Hannibal", comes from the name of a character in 1970s television series Alias Smith and Jones.

Although primarily a helicopter tour guide, Hayes is known for his search-and-rescue feats. He has participated in numerous emergency flights, including searching for survivors during the sinking of Kotuku in the Foveaux Strait and assisting with the 2013 search of a crashed plane on the slopes of Mount Elizabeth in Antarctica. In 2007 he received the Federation Aeronautique Internationale Diploma for Outstanding Airmanship. In 2008, he famously saved his company's flagship helicopter, averting a disastrous crash by landing it "like a fixed-wing aircraft" at 80 knots of ground speed.

In the 2001 New Year Honours, Hayes was appointed a Member of the New Zealand Order of Merit, for services to search and rescue operations. In the 2014 Queen's Birthday Honours, he was promoted to Knight Companion of the New Zealand Order of Merit, for services to Search and Rescue and the community.

In 2019 Hayes led a rescue effort to find the survivors of a helicopter that crashed into the ocean near the Auckland Islands. The three passengers all survived the crash, and were found one day later with only minor injuries.
