= Geoff Robinson (broadcaster) =

Geoff Robinson ONZM
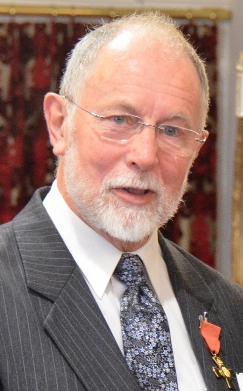
- Robinson in 2014
- Born: Geoffrey Charles Robinson; 18 July 1943 (age 83); London, England
- Occupation: Broadcaster
- Spouse: Liz Robinson
- Children: 2

Geoffrey Charles Robinson ONZM (born 18 July 1943) is a former New Zealand broadcaster, who was the co-host of Morning Report on Radio New Zealand National for all but four years from the programme's inception in 1975 until 2014.

== Biography ==
Born in London, England in 1943, Robinson emigrated to New Zealand in 1965. He became a naturalized New Zealand citizen in 1978.

After a five-year career in banking with the ANZ, Robinson became a broadcaster, joining the New Zealand Broadcasting Corporation as an announcer on radio station 4ZB in Dunedin in 1970. He first presented Morning Report on what is now Radio New Zealand National on 6 June 1975, filling in for regular presenter Joe Kote, and became its permanent host the following year. He was the co-host of the programme until 1 April 2014, apart from a period between 1979 and 1983 when he was a newsreader on commercial radio.

In 2005, Robinson was awarded an honorary Doctor of Literature degree by Victoria University of Wellington, in recognition of his contribution to broadcasting. At the 2007 New Zealand Radio Awards he received a special award for outstanding contribution to radio in New Zealand. In the 2014 Queen's Birthday Honours, Robinson was appointed an Officer of the New Zealand Order of Merit for services to public broadcasting.
