= Barbara Ala'alatoa =

New Zealand school principal

Barbara Ala'alatoa ONZM
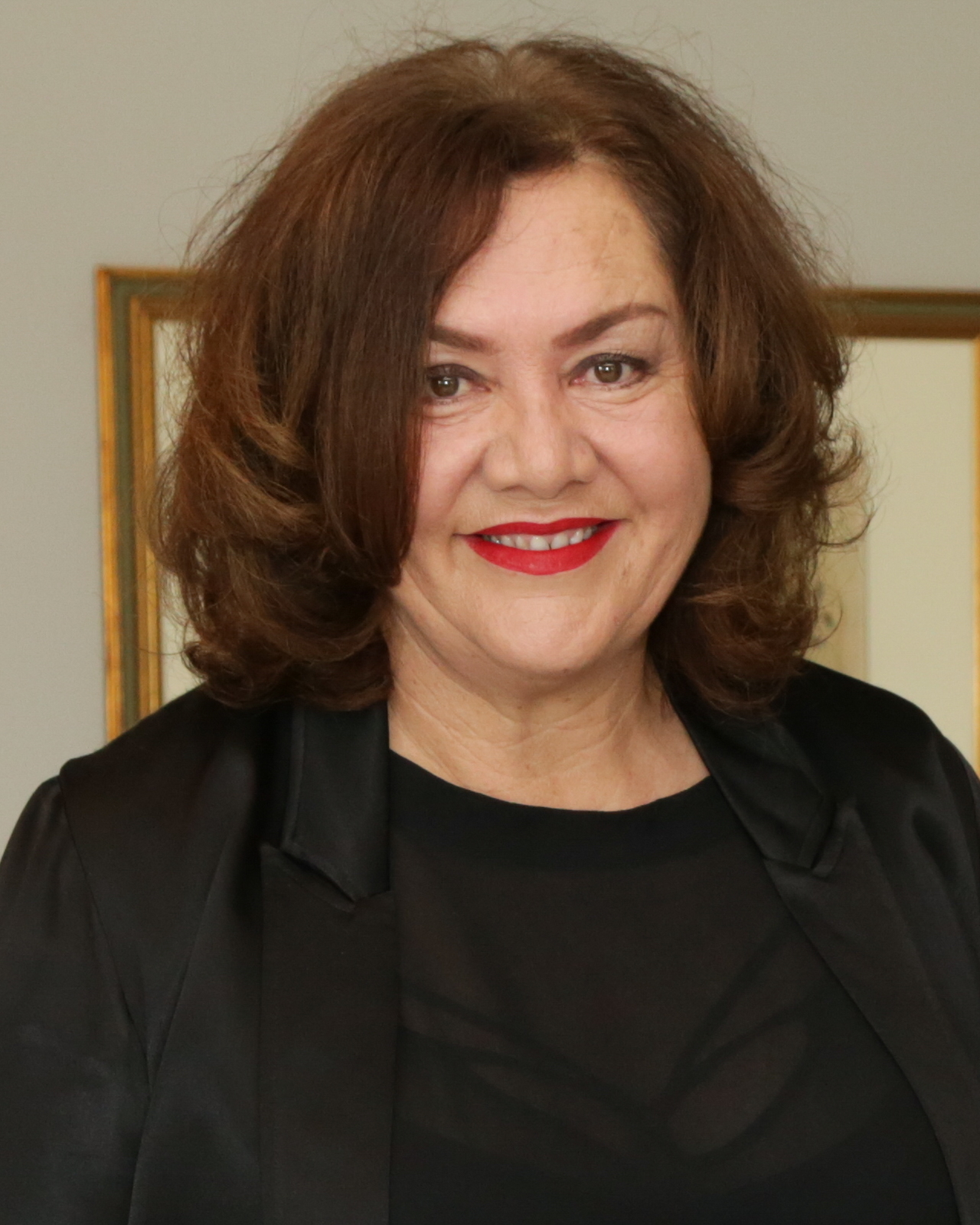
- Ala'alatoa in 2020
- Awards: Officer of the New Zealand Order of Merit, Member of the New Zealand Order of Merit

Barbara Frances Ala'alatoa ONZM is a New Zealand–Samoan school principal, and was chair of the Education Council of Aotearoa New Zealand from 2015 to 2019. In 2014 Ala'alatoa was appointed as a Member of the New Zealand Order of Merit for services to education. In 2020 she was promoted to an Officer of the Order, again for services to education.

== Early life and education ==
Ala'alatoa was born and raised in Auckland, growing up in Ōtara and Māngere. She is of Samoan New Zealand heritage, with a Pākehā mother and a Samoan father.

== Career ==
Ala'alatoa is the principal of Sylvia Park School in Auckland. In 2015 she was appointed as the inaugural chair of the Education Council of Aotearoa New Zealand, a position she held until 2019. She had previously worked as a primary school teacher, as a lecturer and senior lecturer at the Auckland College of Education, and as an improvement co-ordinator at the Ministry of Education. As chair of the Education Council she spoke out against the use of the decile system for school resourcing, which she described as a "blunt instrument".

Ala'alatoa is chair of the correspondence school Te Aho o te Kura Pounamu and a board member of Ako Mātātupu Teach First NZ. She is active in the Pacific Principals Association and the Auckland Primary Principals Association.

== Honours and awards ==
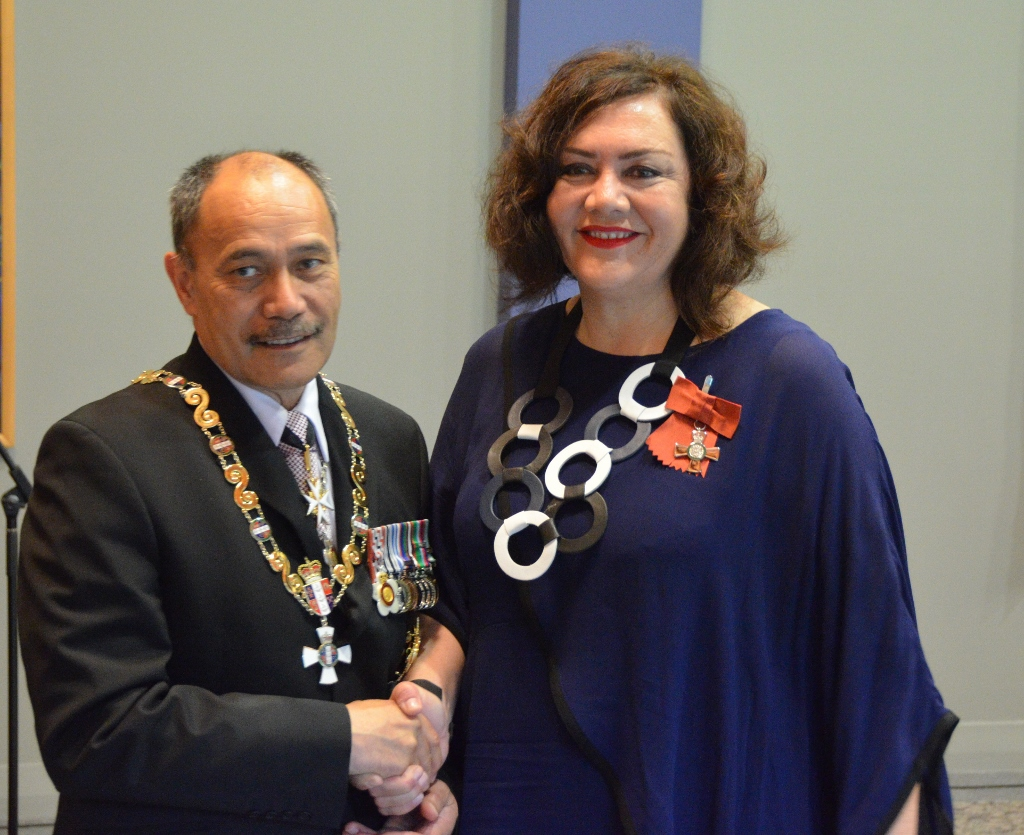
Ala'alatoa (right), after her investiture as a Member of the New Zealand Order of Merit by the governor-general, Sir Jerry Mateparae, at Government House, Auckland, on 19 August 2014

In the 2014 Queen's Birthday Honours, Ala'alatoa was appointed a Member of the New Zealand Order of Merit for services to education. In the 2020 Queen's Birthday Honours she was promoted to an Officer of the Order, again for services to education. She was shortlisted for the Kiwibank New Zealander of the Year Award.
