= 2014 New Zealand gallantry awards =

Awards list for New Zealand

The 2014 New Zealand gallantry awards were announced via a Special Honours List on 9 December 2014, although the identities of all the recipients were not released publicly at the time for security reasons. Subsequently the name of Corporal Steve Askin, previously only referred to as Serviceman D, was revealed on 15 February 2017. All the awards were made in recognition of actions by New Zealand armed forces personnel in Afghanistan during 2011.

== New Zealand Gallantry Star (NZGS) ==
- Corporal David Steven Askin – 1 New Zealand Special Air Service Regiment

Corporal Steve Askin displayed outstanding gallantry on several occasions in Afghanistan in 2011. Corporal Askin repeatedly faced heavy fire from determined enemies and sustained several wounds in the line of duty, while contributing to the resolution of several incidents, the protection of civilian life and undermining enemy operations. Corporal Askin's performance was of the highest order and in keeping with the finest traditions of New Zealand's military record.

- Serviceman J – New Zealand Defence Force

Serviceman J attended an incident in Kabul, Afghanistan in 2011. Serviceman J demonstrated outstanding gallantry and leadership under heavy fire from a determined enemy, contributing to the resolution of the incident and the protection of comrades and civilian life. Serviceman J's performance was of the highest order and in keeping with the finest traditions of New Zealand's military record.

== New Zealand Gallantry Decoration (NZGD) ==
- Serviceman W – New Zealand Defence Force

Serviceman W attended an incident in Kabul, Afghanistan in 2011. Serviceman W demonstrated exceptional gallantry under heavy fire from a determined enemy, was wounded in the line of duty, and contributed to the resolution of the incident and the protection of comrades and civilian life. Serviceman W's performance was in keeping with the finest traditions of New Zealand's military record.

- Serviceman H – New Zealand Defence Force

Serviceman H attended an incident in Kabul, Afghanistan in 2011. Serviceman H demonstrated exceptional gallantry under heavy fire from a determined enemy, contributing to the resolution of the incident and the protection of comrades and civilian life. Serviceman H's performance was in keeping with the finest traditions of New Zealand's military record.

== New Zealand Gallantry Medal (NZGM) ==
- Serviceman J – New Zealand Defence Force

Serviceman J demonstrated gallantry in exposing himself to enemy fire to provide medical support to a wounded comrade during an operation in Afghanistan in 2011. Serviceman J's performance was in keeping with the finest traditions of New Zealand's military record.

- Serviceman D – New Zealand Defence Force

Serviceman D attended an incident in Kabul, Afghanistan in 2011. Serviceman D displayed gallantry in exposing himself to direct fire to assist a wounded comrade, providing leadership in a hazardous environment, and contributing to the resolution of the incident and the protection of civilian life. Serviceman D's performance was in keeping with the finest traditions of New Zealand's military record.

- Serviceman A – New Zealand Defence Force

Serviceman A attended an incident in Kabul, Afghanistan in 2011. Serviceman A demonstrated gallantry in co-ordinating tactical support and communications while exposing himself to the threat of enemy fire, contributing to the resolution of the incident and the protection of comrades and civilian life. Serviceman A's performance was in keeping with the finest traditions of New Zealand's military record.

- Serviceman C – New Zealand Defence Force

Serviceman C attended an incident in Kabul, Afghanistan in 2011. Serviceman C demonstrated gallantry in the protection of comrades and civilian life and in contributing to the resolution of the incident under hazardous circumstances. Serviceman C's performance was in keeping with the finest traditions of New Zealand's military record.

- Serviceman S – New Zealand Defence Force

Serviceman S attended an incident in Kabul, Afghanistan in 2011. Serviceman S displayed gallantry in facing a determined enemy, providing leadership in a hazardous environment, and ultimately contributing to the resolution of the incident and the protection of civilian life. Serviceman S's performance was in keeping with the finest traditions of New Zealand's military record.
