= 2014 New Zealand bravery awards =

The 2014 New Zealand bravery awards were announced via a Special Honours List on 23 June 2014. All the recipients were recognised for acts of bravery following the magnitude 6.3 Christchurch earthquake that struck on 22 February 2011.

== New Zealand Bravery Decoration (NZBD) ==
- Dr Bryan Curran – anaesthetist, Christchurch Hospital.
- Dr Lydia Grace Johns-Putra – urologist, Ballarat, Victoria, Australia.

== New Zealand Bravery Medal (NZBM) ==
- Stephen Acton – senior firefighter, New Zealand Fire Service.
- Michael John Brooklands – sergeant, New Zealand Police.
- Luke Jonathan Burgess – senior firefighter, New Zealand Fire Service.
- Alan Maurice Butcher – station officer, New Zealand Fire Service. Posthumous award – died 18 October 2013.
- Lieutenant Commander Kevin Carr – Royal New Zealand Navy.
- Shane Andrew Cole – station officer, New Zealand Fire Service.
- Shane Allan Cowles – constable, New Zealand Police.
- Kevin Rex Crozier – senior firefighter, New Zealand Fire Service.
- Richard Mark Green – senior firefighter, New Zealand Fire Service.
- Terrence David Gyde – senior firefighter, New Zealand Fire Service.
- Craig Munro Jackson – senior firefighter, New Zealand Fire Service.
- Danny Edward Johanson – senior constable, New Zealand Police.
- Michael Douglas Kneebone – constable, New Zealand Police.
- Joshua James Kumbaroff – firefighter, New Zealand Fire Service.
- Daniel James Lee - constable, New Zealand Police.
- Michael John Lennard – senior firefighter, New Zealand Fire Service.
- Simon James Payton – senior firefighter, New Zealand Fire Service.
- Richard Frank Platt – senior firefighter, New Zealand Fire Service.
- Paul John Rodwell – station officer, New Zealand Fire Service.
- Scott Martin Shadbolt – firefighter, New Zealand Fire Service.
- Steven David Smylie – senior firefighter, New Zealand Fire Service.
- Cory John Stewart – firefighter, New Zealand Fire Service.
- Anthony Wayne Tamakehu – owner of The Chainman, suppliers of specialist lifting and rigging equipment.
- Mark David Whittaker – senior firefighter, New Zealand Fire Service.
- Michael David Yeates – senior firefighter, New Zealand Fire Service.
