= Michael Alaalatoa =

Samoa international rugby union player

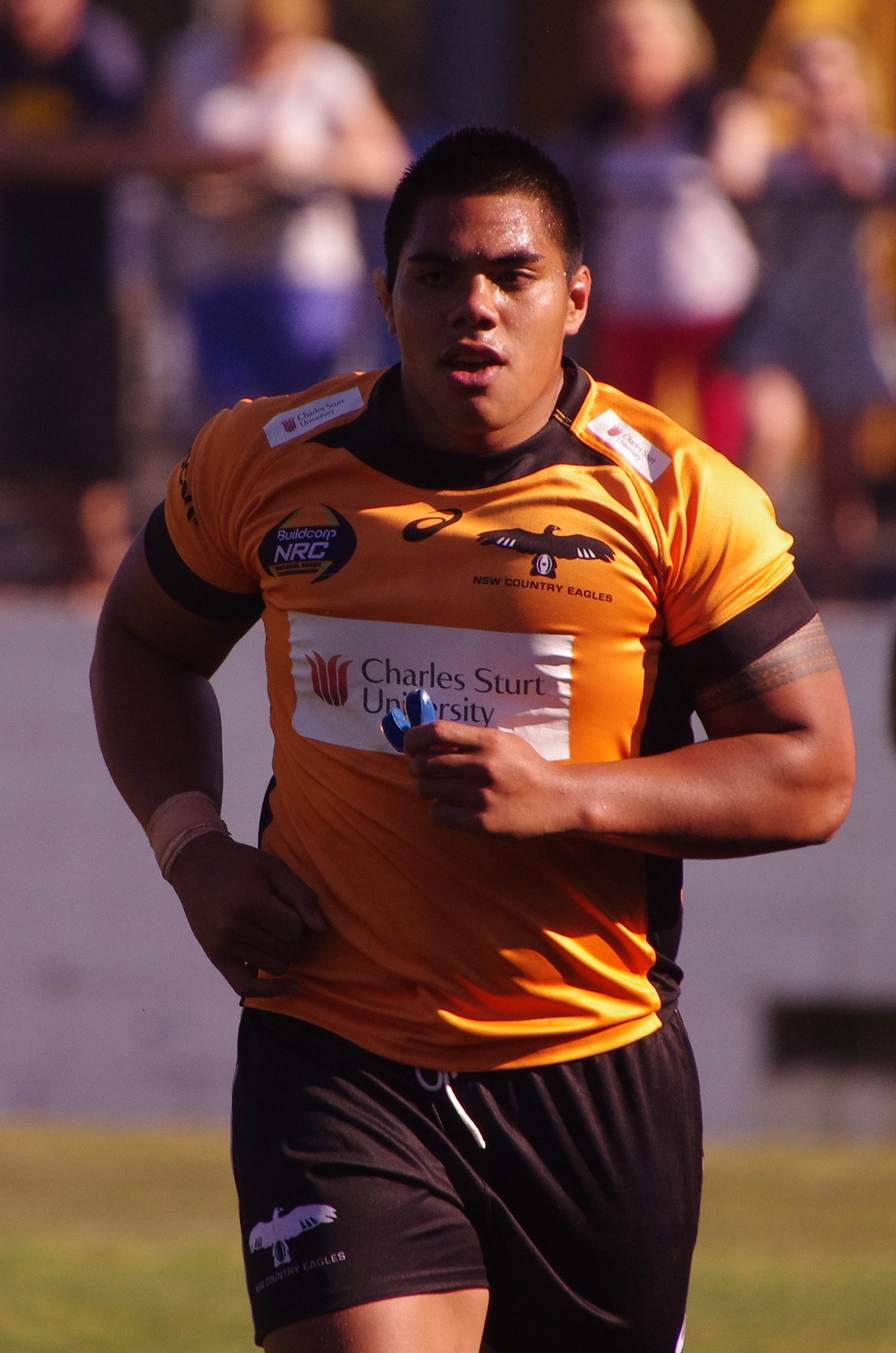
- Alaalatoarepresenting NSW Country Eagles during the National Rugby Championship
- Full name: Michael Savea Alaalatoa
- Born: 28 August 1991 (age 35) Sydney, New South Wales, Australia
- Height: 1.89 m (6 ft 2 in)
- Weight: 132 kg (291 lb; 20 st 11 lb)
- School: Newington College
- Notable relative(s): Vili Alaalatoa (father); Allan Alaalatoa (brother)

Rugby union career
- Position: Prop
- Current team: Munster
Senior career
Years	Team	Apps	(Points)
2013	Southern Districts	15	(0)
2014–2015	West Harbour	38	(15)
2014–2015	Waratahs	1	(0)
2014	NSW Country Eagles	9	(0)
2015–2021	Manawatu	46	(20)
2016–2021	Crusaders	94	(28)
2021–2024	Leinster	72	(30)
2024–	Clermont Auvergne	13	(0)
2025-	Munster	20	(0)
- Correct as of 31 October 2026
International career
Years	Team	Apps	(Points)
2011	Samoa U20	4	(0)
2019–	Samoa	23	(0)
- Correct as of 28 August 2023

Michael Savea Alaalatoa (born 28 August 1991) is a professional rugby union player who plays as a prop for URC club Munster and Samoa national team Born in Australia, he represents Samoa at international level after qualifying on ancestry grounds.He is the brother of wallaby captain Allan Alaalatoa who plays for the Brumbies in the Super League

== Early life ==
Born into a rugby household where father Vili was a member of the Samoa squad for the 1991 Rugby World Cup, Alaalatoa was quickly introduced into the sporting world and played rugby, volleyball and cricket in his childhood.

== Club career ==
Rugby was where he excelled and he played three years in the Newington College First XV. He made his way through the ranks in the New South Wales Shute Shield, initially with Southern Districts and later West Harbour. Some impressive performances at that level saw him become a regular member of the Waratahs wider training squad in 2014.

An injury to regular front-rower Paddy Ryan saw Alaalatoa called up to the Waratahs first team for the final round of league matches in the 2014 Super Rugby season. He made his debut as a second-half replacement in the Waratahs 34–3 victory over the Reds in Brisbane.

Leading up to the 2015 ITM Cup Alaalatoa moved to New Zealand and signed to play for Manawatu where he had a solid season that earned him a 2016 super rugby contract with the Crusaders

It was announced on 12 April 2021 that Alaalatoa would be moving to Leinster to play Pro 14 and European Cup rugby starting in the 2021/22 season.

It was announced on 19 November 2025 that Alaalatoa would be joining Munster in December, until the end of the 2025/2026 season.

== International career ==
Alaalatoa was a member of the Samoa Under 20 side that competed in the 2011 IRB Junior World Championship.

Alaalatoa was eligible to play international rugby for Samoa, Australia through birth and New Zealand through residency.

On 23 August 2019, he was named in Samoa's 34-man training squad for the 2019 Rugby World Cup, before being named in the final 31 on 31 August.
