= Harlan Ala'alatoa =

Australian rugby league footballer

Harlan Alaalatoa
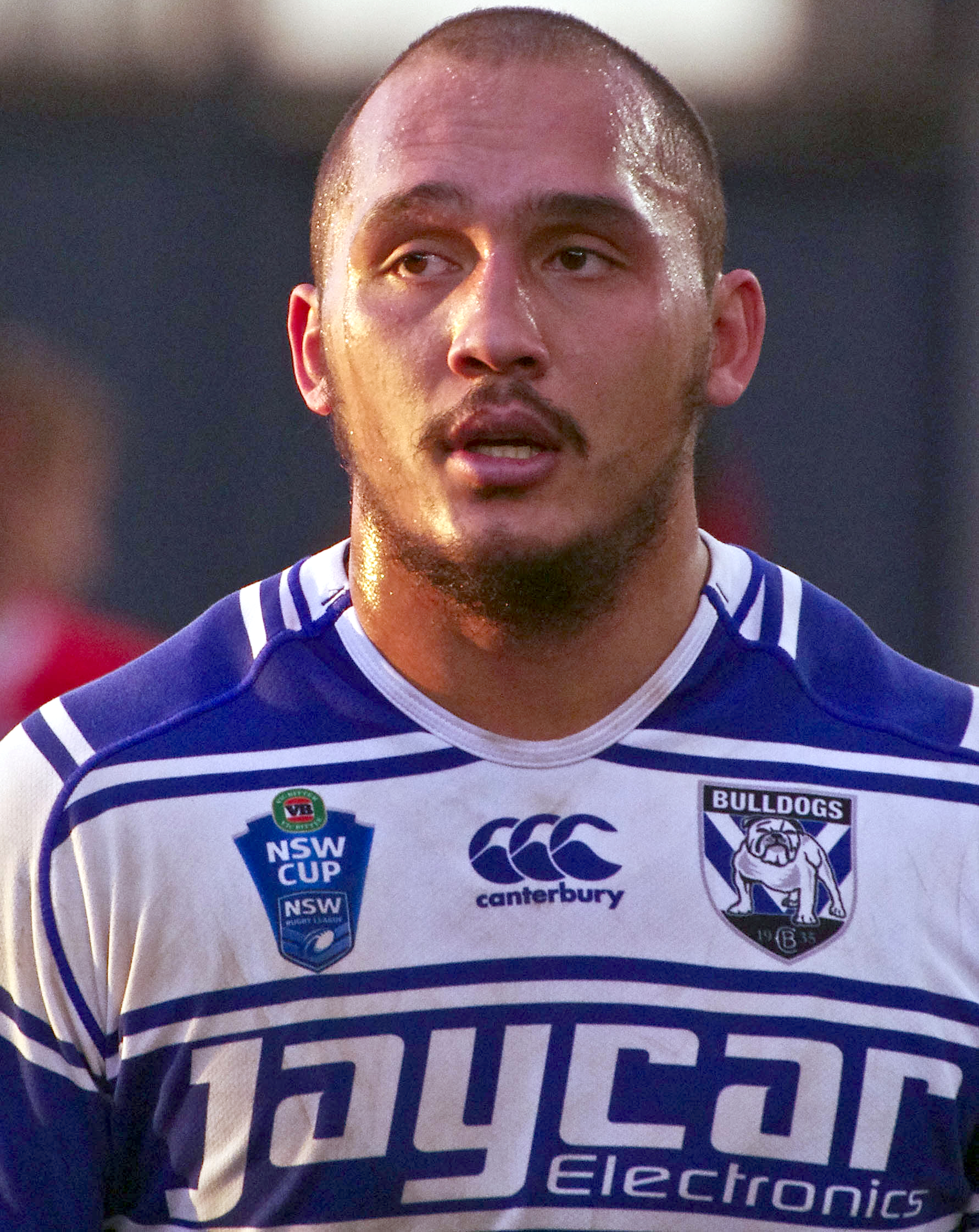

Personal information
- Full name: Harlan Ala'alatoa
- Born: 7 January 1988 (age 37); Sydney, New South Wales, Australia
- Height: 176 cm (5 ft 9 in)
- Weight: 105 kg (16 st 7 lb)

Playing information
- Position: Second-row, Lock
Club
| Years | Team | Pld | T | G | FG | P |
|---|---|---|---|---|---|---|
| 2013 | Canterbury Bulldogs | 1 | 0 | 0 | 0 | 0 |

Harlan Ala'alatoa (born 7 January 1988) is an Australian former professional rugby league footballer who played for the Canterbury-Bankstown Bulldogs in 2013. He primarily played in the second-row and at lock.

== Playing career ==
Born in Sydney, Alaalatoa played his junior football for the Bankstown Bulls before being signed by the Canterbury-Bankstown Bulldogs. He played for the Bulldogs' NYC team in 2008.

In 2012, Alaalatoa won the Terry Lamb Medal for the NSW Cup Player of the Year award and was also named at lock in the 2012 NSW Cup Team of the Year.

In Round 5 of the 2013 NRL season, Alaalatoa made his NRL debut for the Bulldogs against the Manly-Warringah Sea Eagles.
