= Allan Alaalatoa =

Australian rugby union player (born 1994)

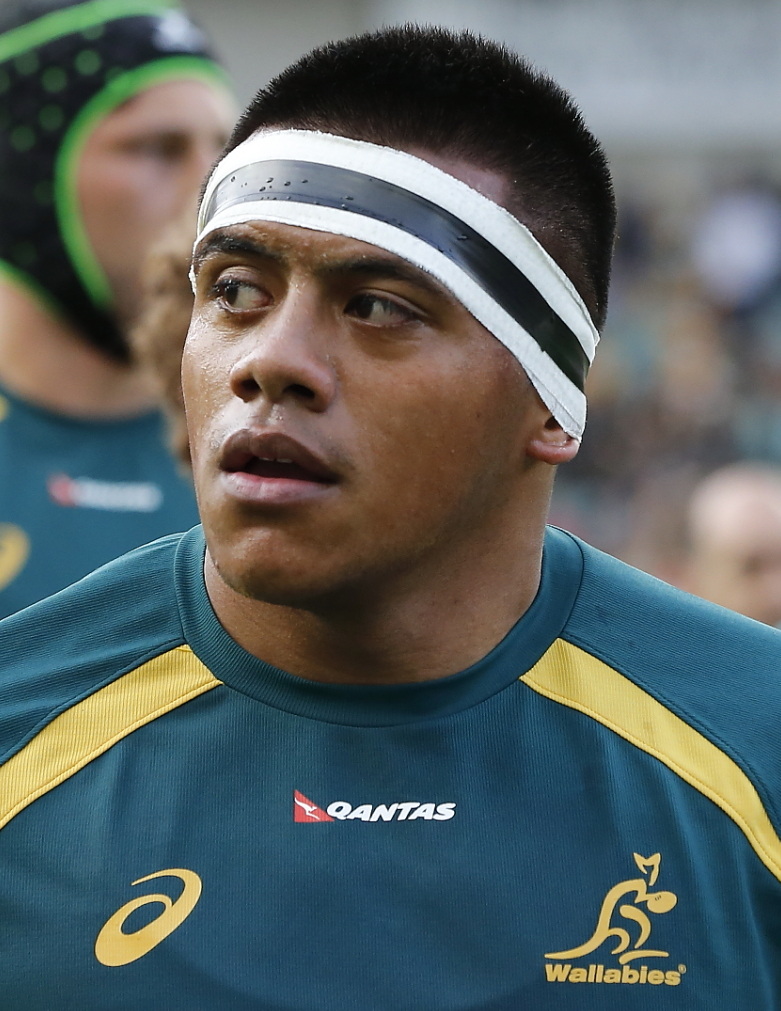
- Alaalatoa in 2017
- Full name: Allan Emani Alaalatoa
- Born: 28 January 1994 (age 32) Sydney, Australia
- Height: 1.82 m (6 ft 0 in)
- Weight: 125 kg (276 lb; 19 st 10 lb)
- School: Newington College
- Notable relative(s): Michael Alaalatoa (brother); Vili Alaalatoa (father)

Rugby union career
- Position: Prop
- Current team: Brumbies
Amateur team(s)
Years	Team	Apps	(Points)
2013-	Southern Districts	7	(0)
Senior career
Years	Team	Apps	(Points)
2014–	Brumbies	152	(65)
2014−	Canberra Vikings	19	(15)
- Correct as of 5 June 2026
International career
Years	Team	Apps	(Points)
2012-2014	Australia Under 20	10	(5)
2016-	Australia	97	(5)
- Correct as of 16 November 2026

Allan Alaalatoa (born 28 January 1994) is an Australian professional rugby union player who plays as a prop for the Brumbies in Super Rugby and the Australian rugby union team, the Wallabies.

Alaalatoa's father Vili is a fan of cricket and named him after the Australia cricket captain Allan Border. Alaalatoa's nickname with the Brumbies squad is also rumoured to be Captain Grumpy.

== Career ==
Alaalatoa hails from a rugby family with father Vili playing for Samoa in the 1991 Rugby World Cup and brother Michael also going on to play professionally with the New South Wales Waratahs, the Crusaders and Leinster Rugby. He attended Newington College where he played for three years in the 1st XV and completed the HSC in 2011. His big break came ahead of the 2014 Super Rugby season when he was named in the Brumbies extended playing squad. He didn't get any game time during the regular season, but surprisingly was given a debut off the replacements bench in the Brumbies 32-30 victory over the Chiefs during the Super Rugby playoffs.

== International ==
Alaalatoa is in the rare position of having represented his country in 3 consecutive IRB Junior World Championships, in 2012, 2013 and 2014.

In 2016, Alaalatoa was named in the Wallabies preliminary 39-man squad for the 2016 series against England. He was selected for his first Test against New Zealand, starting on the bench in the Bledisloe Cup on 20 August 2016.

Alaalatoa became the Wallabies 85th captain in the third round of the Autumn Nations Cup when the Wallabies played against Italy in a 28 to 27 loss, the Australian's first ever loss against Italy.

In July 2023, Alaalatoa ruptured an Achilles tendon in a test against New Zealand, ruling him out of the 2023 Rugby World Cup.

== Super Rugby statistics ==
As of 5 June 2026

Season	Team	Games	Starts	Sub	Mins	Tries	Cons	Pens	Drops	Points	Yel	Red
2014	Brumbies	2	0	2	7	0	0	0	0	0	0	0
2015	Brumbies	11	1	10	240	1	0	0	0	5	0	0
2016	Brumbies	16	2	14	507	0	0	0	0	0	0	0
2017	Brumbies	15	15	0	937	0	0	0	0	0	0	0
2018	Brumbies	15	15	0	1008	0	0	0	0	0	1	0
2019	Brumbies	16	16	0	1048	1	0	0	0	5	0	0
2020	Brumbies	15	15	0	1044	0	0	0	0	0	0	0
2021	Brumbies	12	12	0	800	0	0	0	0	0	0	1
2022	Brumbies	12	11	1	748	0	0	0	0	0	0	0
2023	Brumbies	10	9	1	469	0	0	0	0	0	1	0
2024	Brumbies	8	8	0	457	2	0	0	0	10	0	0
2025	Brumbies	14	14	0	805	8	0	0	0	40	0	0
2026	Brumbies	6	6	0	310	1	0	0	0	5	0	0
Total		152	124	28	8380	13	0	0	0	65	2	1

== International statistics ==
As of 16 November 2026

Season	Team	Matches	Starter	Sub	Min	Tries	Drop	Pen	Con	Points	Yel	Red
2016	Australia	8	1	7	221	0	0	0	0	0	0	0
2017	Australia	13	5	8	408	0	0	0	0	0	0	0
2018	Australia	9	5	4	381	0	0	0	0	0	0	0
2019	Australia	6	6	0	323	0	0	0	0	0	0	0
2020	Australia	6	3	3	273	0	0	0	0	0	0	0
2021	Australia	10	7	3	469	0	0	0	0	0	1	0
2022	Australia	11	10	1	635	0	0	0	0	0	0	0
2023	Australia	3	3	0	173	0	0	0	0	0	0	0
2024	Australia	13	5	8	570	1	0	0	0	5	0	0
2025	Australia	8	5	3	372	0	0	0	0	0	0	0
2026	Australia	10	10	0	495	0	0	0	0	0	0	0
Grand Total		97	60	37	4320	1	0	0	0	5	1	0
