= Vili Alaalatoa =

Samoan rugby union player

- Born: August 9, 1962 (age 64) Samoa
- Notable relative(s): Michael Alaalatoa (son); Allan Alaalatoa (son)

Rugby union career
- Position: Prop
Senior career
Years	Team	Apps	(Points)
1988	West Harbour		
1990-1997	Manly		
International career
Years	Team	Apps	(Points)
1988-1992	Samoa	10	(0)

Vili Alaalatoa (born August 9, 1962) is a Samoan rugby union player. He plays as a prop. He played for West Harbour RFC, and then, for Manly RUFC

== Career ==
Alaalatoa debuted for Western Samoa in the test match against Ireland at Lansdowne Road in 1988. He was a member of the Western Samoan team during the 1991 Rugby World Cup. His last international for Western Samoa was a test against Fiji in 1992, at Suva.

== Personal life ==
A fan of cricket, Vili is father of Michael Alaalatoa, who plays for Munster and Samoa, and Allan Alaalatoa, who plays for the Brumbies and Australia and who was named after Australia cricket captain Allan Border.
