= List of United States Naval Academy alumni =

Distinguished Academy Alumni

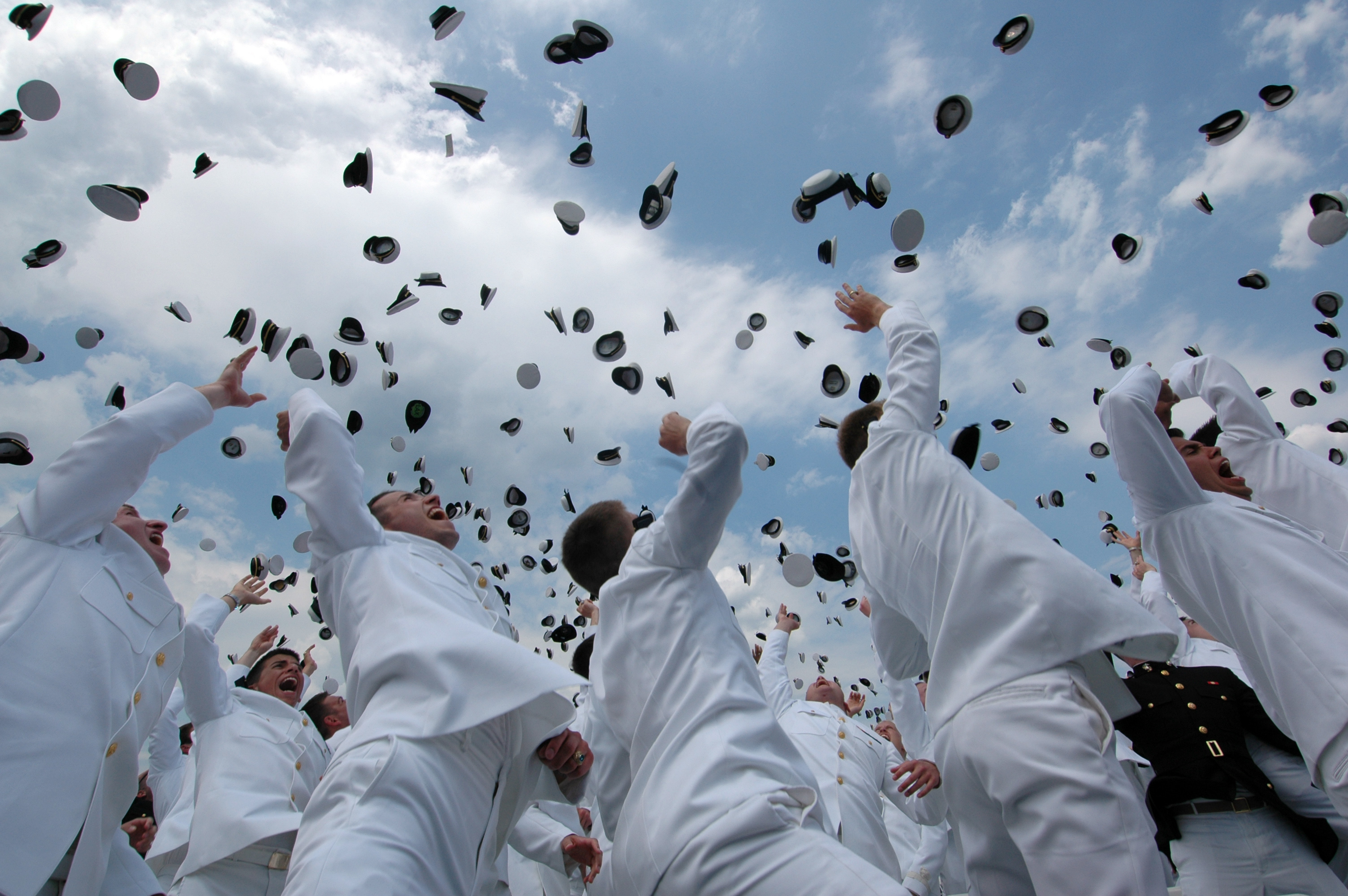
Traditional hat toss at the graduation ceremony at the United States Naval Academy

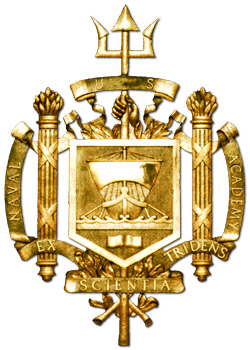
Logo of the Naval Academy

The United States Naval Academy (USNA) is an undergraduate college in Annapolis, Maryland with the mission of educating and commissioning officers for the United States Navy and Marine Corps. The Academy was founded in 1845 and graduated its first class in 1846. The Academy is often referred to as Annapolis, while sports media refer to the Academy as "Navy" and the students as "Midshipmen"; this usage is officially endorsed. During the latter half of the 19th century and the first decades of the 20th, the United States Naval Academy was the primary source of U.S. Navy and Marine Corps officers, with the Class of 1881 being the first to provide officers to the Marine Corps. Graduates of the Academy are also given the option of entering the United States Army or United States Air Force. Most Midshipmen are admitted through the congressional appointment system. The curriculum emphasizes various fields of engineering.

The list is drawn from graduates, non-graduate former Midshipmen, current Midshipmen, and faculty of the Naval Academy. Over 50 U.S. astronauts have graduated from the Naval Academy, more than from any other undergraduate institution. Over 990 noted scholars from a variety of academic fields are Academy graduates, including 45 Rhodes Scholars and 16 Marshall Scholars. Additional notable graduates include 1 President of the United States, 2 Nobel Prize recipients, and 73 Medal of Honor recipients.

== Academics ==
"Class year" refers to the alumni's class year, which usually is the same year they graduated. However, in times of war, classes often graduate early. For example, the Class of 1943 actually graduated in 1942.

Name	Class year	Notability	References
William Harwar Parker	1848	Naval Academy instructor and professor of Mathematics, Navigation and Astronomy (1853–1857); served with the Virginia State Navy during the American Civil War, then the Confederacy and Confederate States Naval Academy by serving as its Superintendent from October 1863 on the school ship CSS Patrick Henry, located outside of Richmond, Virginia on the James River, Virginia; in April 1865, as the Confederate capital at Richmond was evacuated, he led the C.S. Naval Academy's midshipmen as a guard for their failing government's archives and treasury	
Alfred Thayer Mahan	1859	Rear admiral; theorist of naval warfare as Sea Power; Mahan Hall at the Academy named in his honor	
William Sims	1880	Admiral; World War I commander; served twice as president of the Naval War College	
Edward Walter Eberle	1885	Admiral; superintendent of the Academy (1915–1919); chief of Naval Operations (1923–1927)	
John A. Lejeune	1888	World War I Army Division commander; commandant of the Marine Corps (1920–29); superintendent of Virginia Military Institute (1929–37)	
Emory S. Land	1902	Vice admiral; chairman of the United States Maritime Commission during World War II; oversaw establishment of the United States Merchant Marine Academy	
James L. Holloway Jr.	1919	Admiral; destroyer officer in both World Wars; developed the Holloway Plan for the Naval Reserve Officers Training Corps (NROTC); superintendent of the Academy (1947–1950); father of Admiral James L. Holloway III	
Edward J. O'Donnell (military)	1929	Rear admiral, fought in WWII and Korea, commanded Guantanamo Bay Naval Base; superintendent of the Naval Postgraduate School (1965–1967); president of the New York Maritime College for six years (1967–1972)	
William Appleman Williams	1945	Influential and controversial historian of American foreign policy during the Cold War	
Stansfield Turner	1947	Admiral; Rhodes Scholar; president of the Naval War College (1972–1974), director of Central Intelligence (DCI) (1977–1981)	
Carlisle Trost	1953	Admiral; chief of Naval Operations (1986–1990); submarine officer; graduated first in his class; Olmsted Scholar	
John Rodgers (theologian)	1954	U.S. Marine; Anglican bishop and dean-president of Trinity School for Ministry	
Dennis C. Blair	1968	Admiral; Rhodes Scholar; commander of U.S. Pacific Command (1999–2002); former president of Institute for Defense Analyses; third director of National Intelligence (2009–2010)	
Ronald K. Machtley	1970	Representative from Rhode Island (1987–1995); president of Bryant University (1996–2020)	

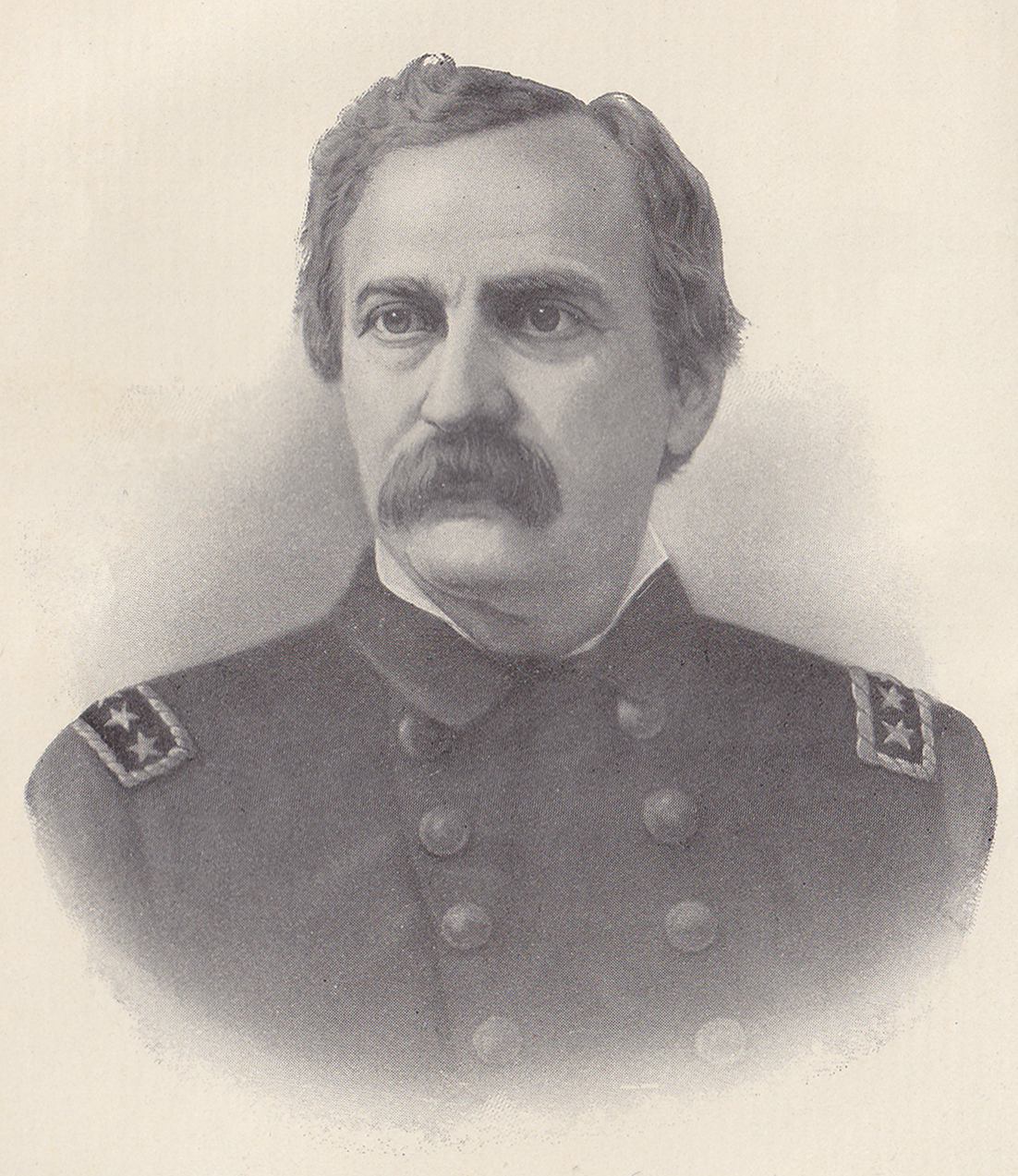
William Harwar Parker

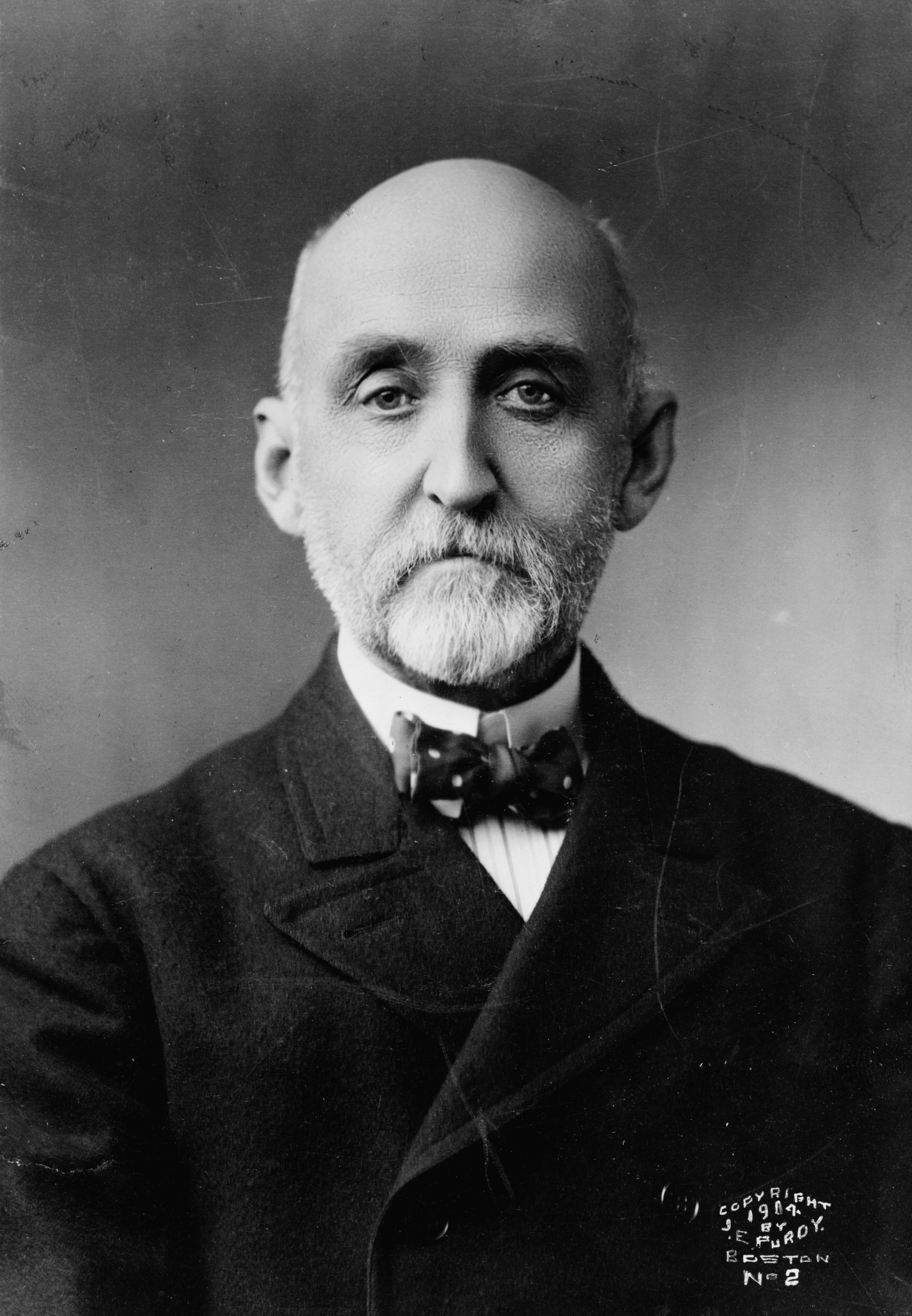
Alfred Thayer Mahan

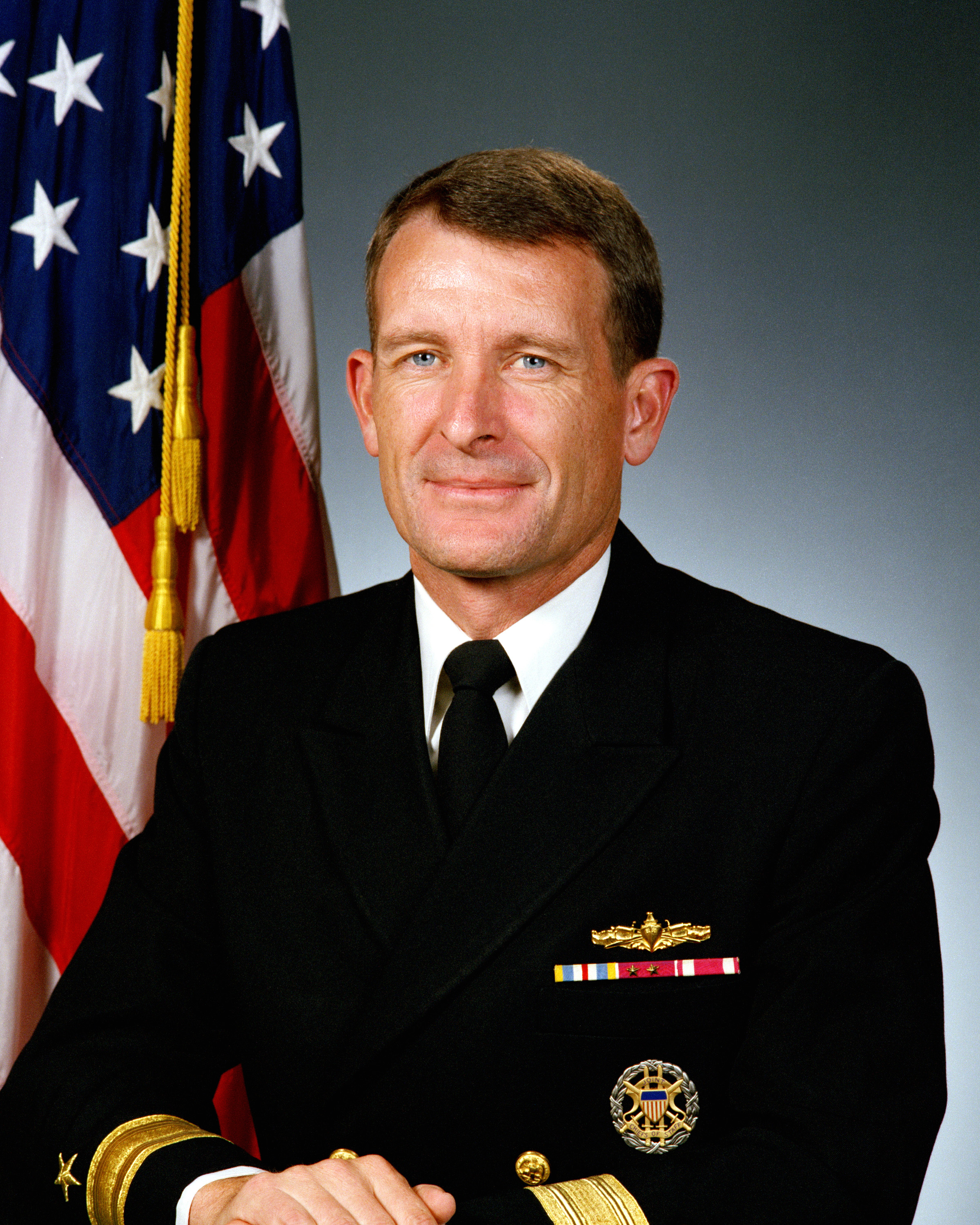
Dennis Blair

== Astronauts ==
Name	Class year	Notability	References
Alan Shepard	1945	Rear admiral; World War II veteran; Navy test pilot; first U.S. astronaut in space on board Mercury-Redstone 3 and only Mercury Seven astronaut to walk on the Moon; commanded the Apollo 14 mission	
Walter Schirra	1946	Captain; World War II veteran; one of the original Mercury 7 astronauts; only person to fly in all of America's first three space programs (Mercury, Gemini and Apollo);logged a total of 295 hours and 15 minutes in space; fifth American and the ninth human to ride a rocket into space; first person to go into space three times	
James Irwin	1951	Colonel (USAF); U.S. astronaut, aeronautical engineer, test pilot, and United States Air Force pilot; lunar module pilot for Apollo 15, the fourth human lunar landing; eighth person to walk on the Moon and the first, and youngest, of those astronauts to die	
Jim Lovell	1952	Served in the Korean War; Navy test pilot; astronaut participating in Gemini 7, Gemini 12, Apollo 8, and commanding the ill-fated Apollo 13, which he brought back safely	
William Anders	1955	Apollo 8 command pilot, first human crew to orbit the Moon; took the famous Earthrise photograph	
Bruce McCandless II	1958	CAPT (USNA); U.S. astronaut, U.S. naval officer and aviator, electrical engineer, and NASA astronaut; in 1984, during the first of his two Space Shuttle missions, he made the first untethered free flight by using the Manned Maneuvering Unit (1937–2017)	
Charles F. Bolden Jr.	1968	Major general; United States Marine Corps test pilot; pilot of STS-61-C and STS-31; commanded STS-45 and STS-60; nominated in 2009 to be NASA administrator	
Ken Bowersox	1978	Pilot of STS-50, commanded STS-61, STS-73, STS-82 and International Space Station Expedition 6	
Wendy B. Lawrence	1981	Navy helicopter pilot; mission specialist for STS-67, STS-86, STS-91, and STS-114; daughter of William P. Lawrence, a finalist in the Mercury astronaut selection	
William C. McCool	1983	Naval officer and aviator, test pilot, aeronautical engineer, and NASA astronaut; pilot of Space Shuttle Columbia mission STS-107; killed when Columbia disintegrated during reentry into the atmosphere (1961–2003); posthumously awarded the Congressional Space Medal of Honor.	
Christopher Loria	1983	Retired United States Marine Corps colonel and a medically retired NASA astronaut; was originally scheduled to fly on STS-113 as pilot, but was grounded due to a back injury (born 1960)	
Kayla Barron	2010	Varsity cross country; Gates Cambridge scholarship; Navy submarine officer; among the first women on submarines; selected as an astronaut in 2017	

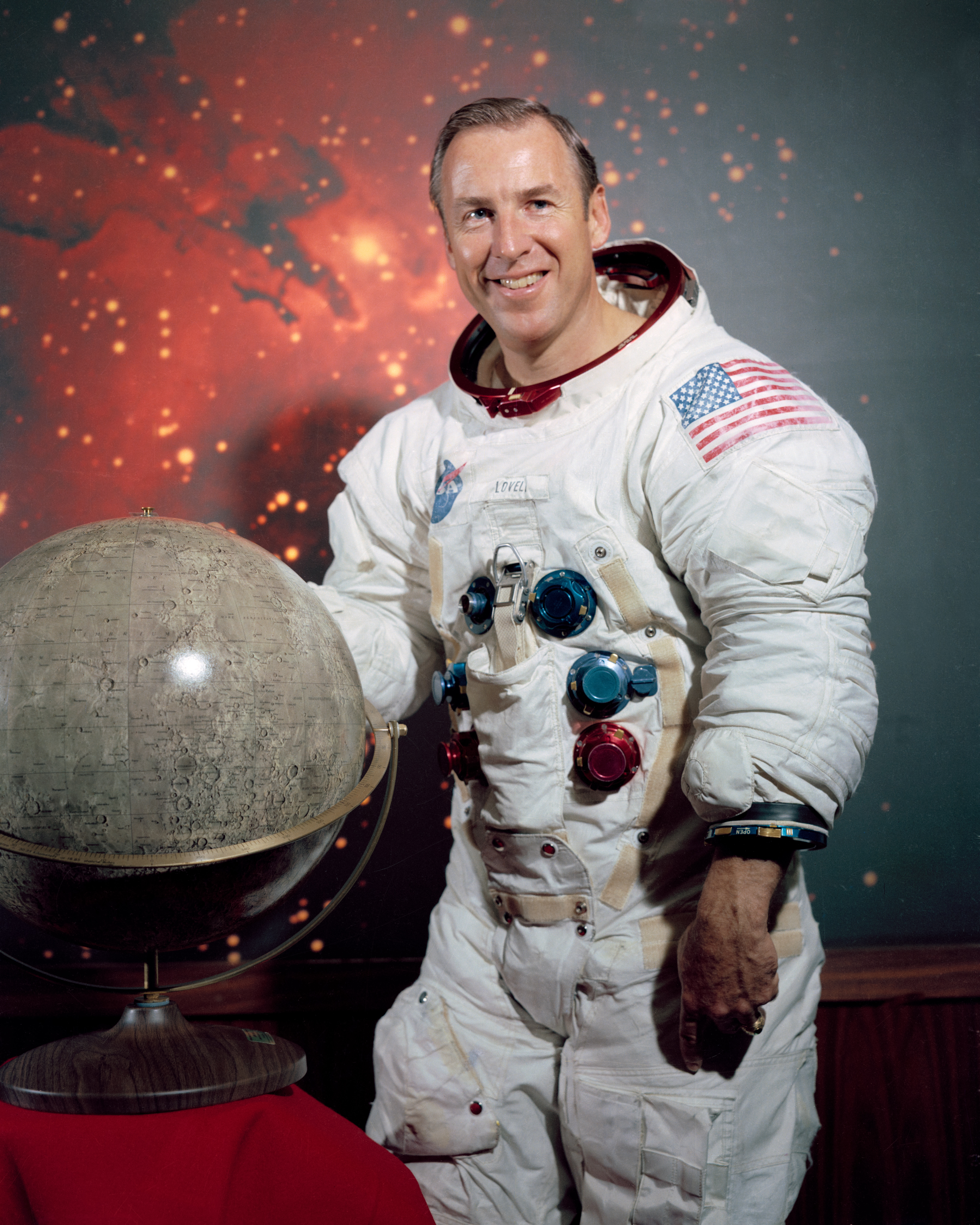
James A. Lovell

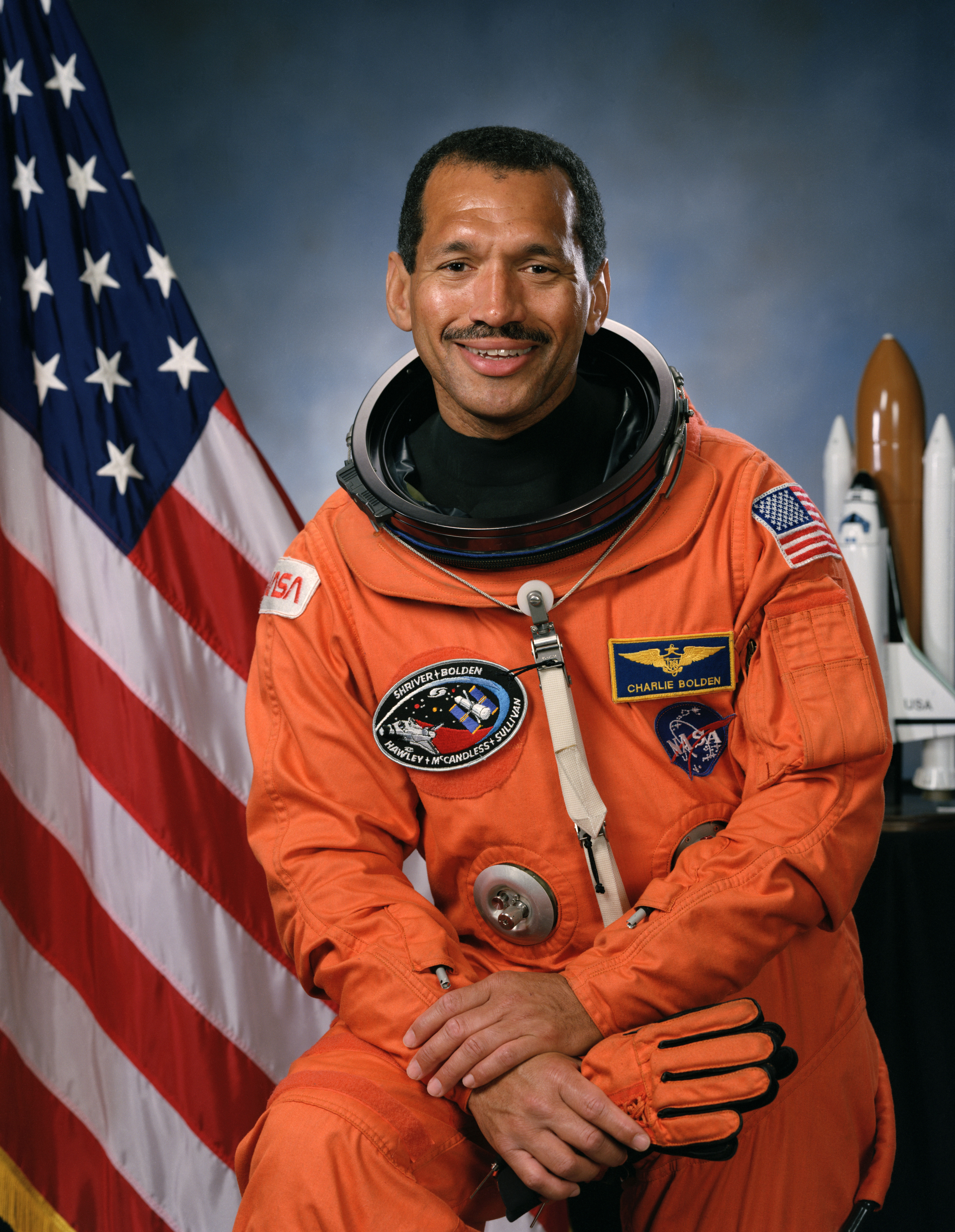
Charles Bolden

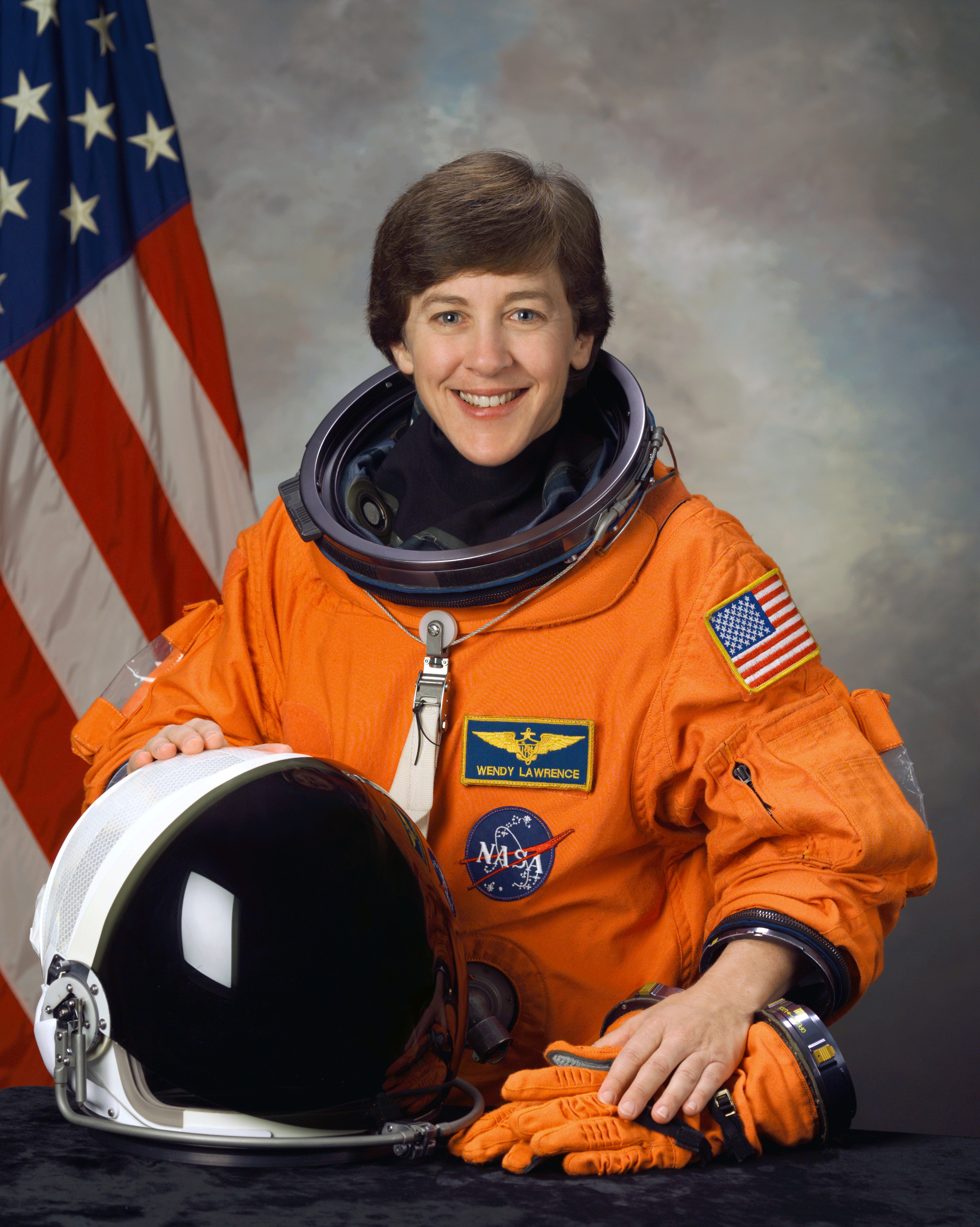
Wendy Lawrence

== Athletes ==
=== Basketball players ===
Name	Class year	Notability	References
Laurence Wild	1913	1913 NCAA Men's Basketball All-American; head coach of the Navy Midshipmen men's basketball team; 30th governor of American Samoa (1940–1942)	
Elliott Loughlin	1933	1933 NCAA Men's Basketball All-American; recipient of the Silver Star, two-time recipient of the Navy Cross and Legion of Merit	
Hank Egan	1960	National Basketball Association (NBA) assistant coach with Cleveland Cavaliers (2006–present); assistant coach with Golden State Warriors (2002–2003); assistant coach with San Antonio Spurs (1995–2002); 1999 NBA Champion with San Antonio Spurs; head coach at the United States Air Force Academy 1971–1984	
David Robinson	1987	Former NBA player with San Antonio Spurs; Rookie of the Year in 1990; NBA Most Valuable Player Award in 1995; played on NBA championship teams in 1999 and 2003; won the FIBA World Championship in 1986, a bronze medal in the 1988 Olympics, and gold medals in 1992 and 1996; member of the Basketball Hall of Fame induction Class of 2009	
Doug Wojcik	1987	Assistant at Navy (1990–99), Notre Dame (1999–2000), North Carolina (2000–03), and Michigan State (2003–05); head men's basketball coach at the University of Tulsa (2005–2012) and College of Charleston (2012–2014)	

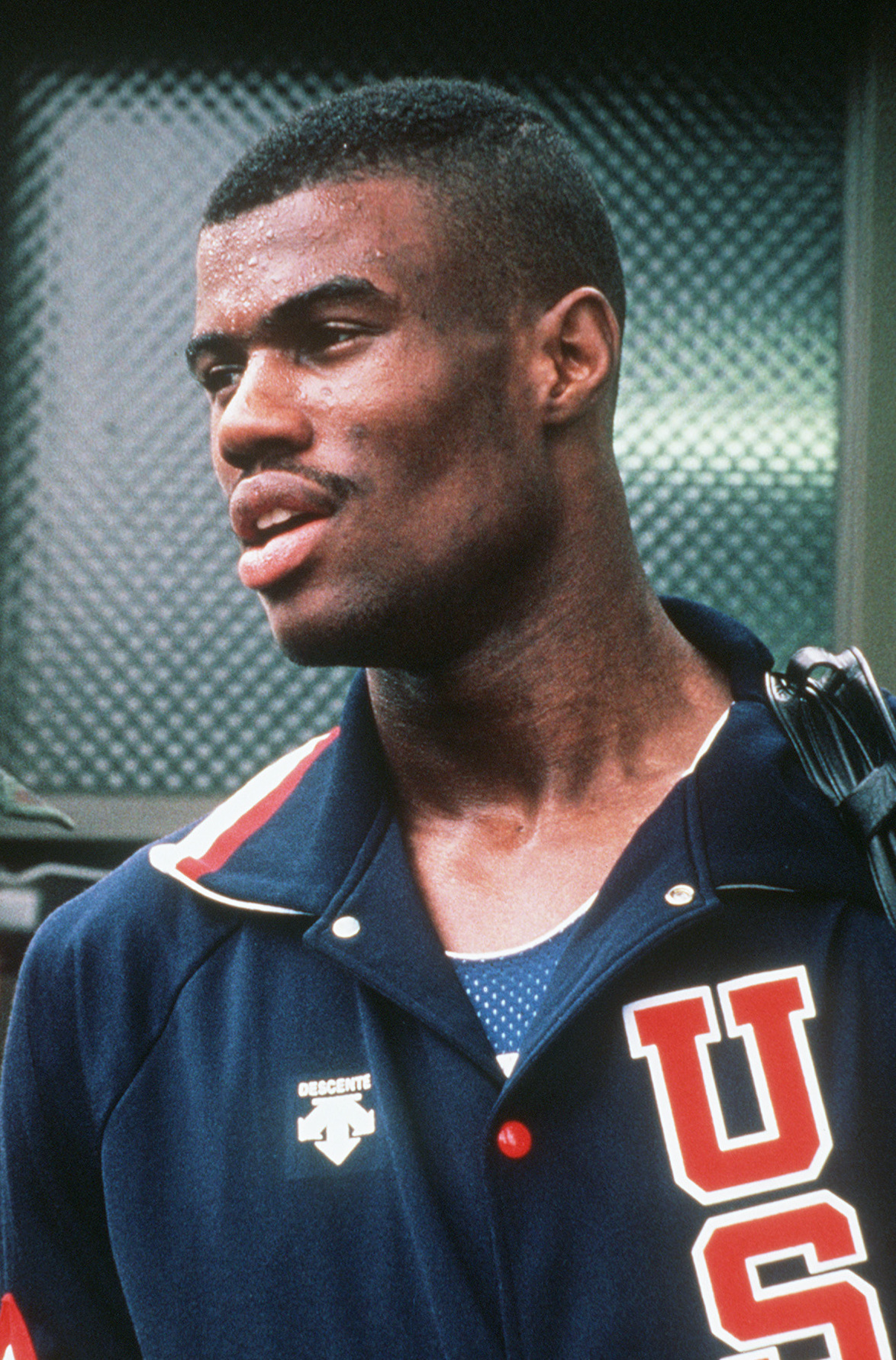
David Robinson

=== Football players ===
Name	Class year	Notability	References
Thomas J. Hamilton	1927	Halfback on 1926 National Championship team; head coach and athletic director at the Academy and the University of Pittsburgh; commissioner of the AWWU/Pac-8 Conference; World War II veteran; winner of the Theodore Roosevelt Award from the NCAA, the Stagg Award from the American Football Coaches Association and the Gold Medal from the National Football Foundation; member of College Football Hall of Fame	
Slade D. Cutter	1935	An all-American football player, he achieved instant fame as a first classman when he won the 1934 Army-Navy game with a first-quarter field goal; on the basis of his Academy football career, he was later inducted into the College Football Hall of Fame	
Donald B. Whitmire	1945	Played tackle for Alabama, 1941–1942 and Navy, 1943–1944; brigade commander, the highest rank a midshipman can attain, at the Naval Academy; on the basis of his Alabama and Academy football career, he was later inducted into the College Football Hall of Fame in 1956	
Ben Chase	1946	1944 consensus All-American	
Leon Bramlett	1947	First played football for the University of Mississippi in 1941 and the University of Alabama; graduated in 1947 from the Academy, where he was in 1944 and 1945 an All-American player; also lettered in boxing and was a heavyweight champion in 1944 and 1945; inducted into the Mississippi Sports Hall of Fame in 1988	
Bob McElwee	1957	National Football League (NFL) referee for 27 years (1976–2003); officiated three Super Bowls; commissioned in the United States Air Force	
Bob Reifsnyder	1959	1957 All-American defensive end; 1957 Maxwell Award winner; Member College Football Hall of Fame; professional football player	
Joe Bellino	1961	1960 Heisman Trophy winner; American football halfback in the American Football League for the Boston Patriots	
Roger Staubach	1965	1963 Heisman Trophy and Maxwell Award in 1963, his junior year at the Academy; National Football League Hall of Fame quarterback with the Dallas Cowboys; member of College Football Hall of Fame	
Tom O'Brien	1971	Associate head coach with University of Virginia (2013–present); former football head coach with North Carolina State (2007–2012); former football head coach with Boston College (1996–2006)	
John Stufflebeem	1975	Recipient of the Silver Anniversary Award from the National Collegiate Athletic Association	
Phil McConkey	1979	National Football League wide receiver who won Super Bowl XXI with the New York Giants	
Napoleon McCallum	1985	Former National Football League running back for the Los Angeles Raiders (1986–1994); fulfilled his Navy commitment while playing for the Raiders; inducted to the College Football Hall of Fame in 2003; the Academy's Napoleon McCallum Trophy is named in his honor	
Kyle Eckel	2005	Former National Football League running back	
Malcolm Perry	2019	Drafted in 2019 by the Miami Dolphins	

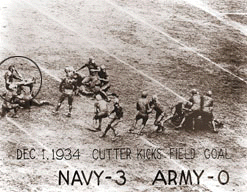
Slade Cutter

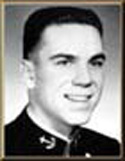
Roger Staubach

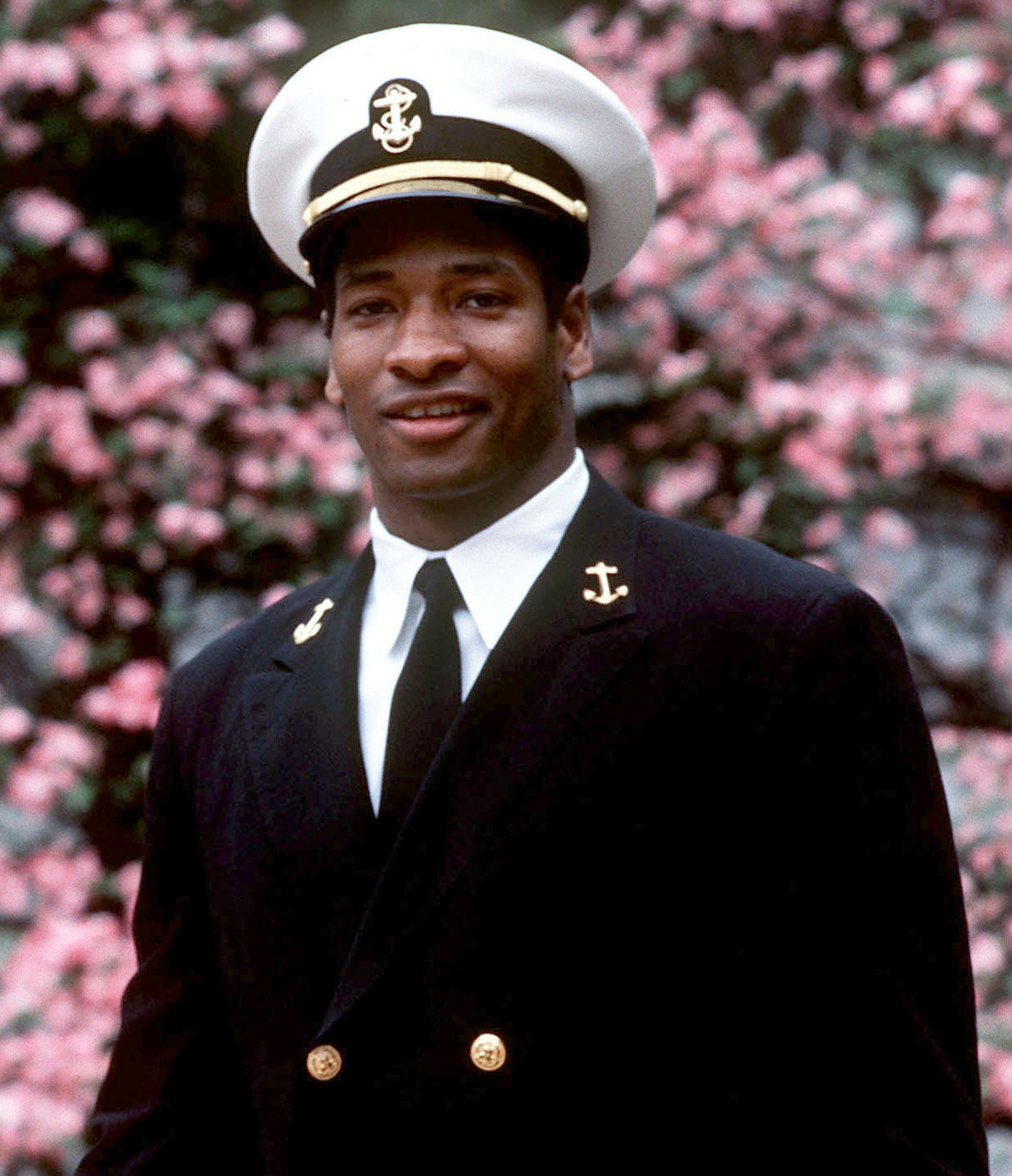
Napoleon McCallum

=== Olympics competitors ===
Name	Class year	Notability	References
Harris Laning	1895	Admiral; captain of the United States Rifle Team which won the gold medal at the 1912 Summer Olympics for military team shooting	
Carl Osburn	1907	Winner of 11 Olympic medals: 5 gold, 4 silver, 2 bronze: for shooting at the 1912 Summer Olympics, 1920 Summer Olympics, 1924 Summer Olympics; holding the record for total medal count by an American male for 84 years (1924–2008)	
Edwin Graves	1921	Co-winner of the 1920 Olympics gold medal for crew (rowing)	
Virgil Jacomini	1921	Co-winner of the 1920 Olympics gold medal for crew	
Edward Moore	1921	Co-winner of the 1920 Olympics gold medal for crew	
Sherm Clark	1922	Co-winner of the 1920 Olympics gold medal for crew	
Vincent Gallagher	1922	Co-winner of the 1920 Olympics gold medal for crew	
Donald Johnston	1922	Co-winner of the 1920 Olympics gold medal for crew	
William Jordan	1922	Co-winner of the 1920 Olympics gold medal for crew	
Clyde King	1922	Co-winner of the 1920 Olympics gold medal for crew	
Alden Sanborn	1922	Co-winner of the 1920 Olympics gold medal for crew	
Thomas F. Connolly	1933	Vice admiral; bronze medalist in Rope Climbing at the 1932 Summer Olympics	
Charles Manring	1952	Co-winner of the 1952 Olympics gold medal for crew (rowing)	
Robert Detweiler	1953	Co-winner of the 1952 Olympics gold medal for crew	
Frank Shakespeare	1953	Co-winner of the 1952 Olympics gold medal for crew	
William Fields	1954	Co-winner of the 1952 Olympics gold medal for crew	
Wayne Frye	1954	Co-winner of the 1952 Olympics gold medal for crew	
Richard Murphy	1954	Co-winner of the 1952 Olympics gold medal for crew	
Henry Proctor	1954	Co-winner of the 1952 Olympics gold medal for crew	
Edward Stevens	1954	Co-winner of the 1952 Olympics gold medal for crew	
James Dunbar	1955	Co-winner of the 1952 Olympics gold medal for crew	
Peter S. Blair	1955	As captain of the 1956 Olympic wrestling team, won a bronze medal losing on points to the silver and gold winners	
Casey Bahr	1970	1972 Summer Olympics soccer team	

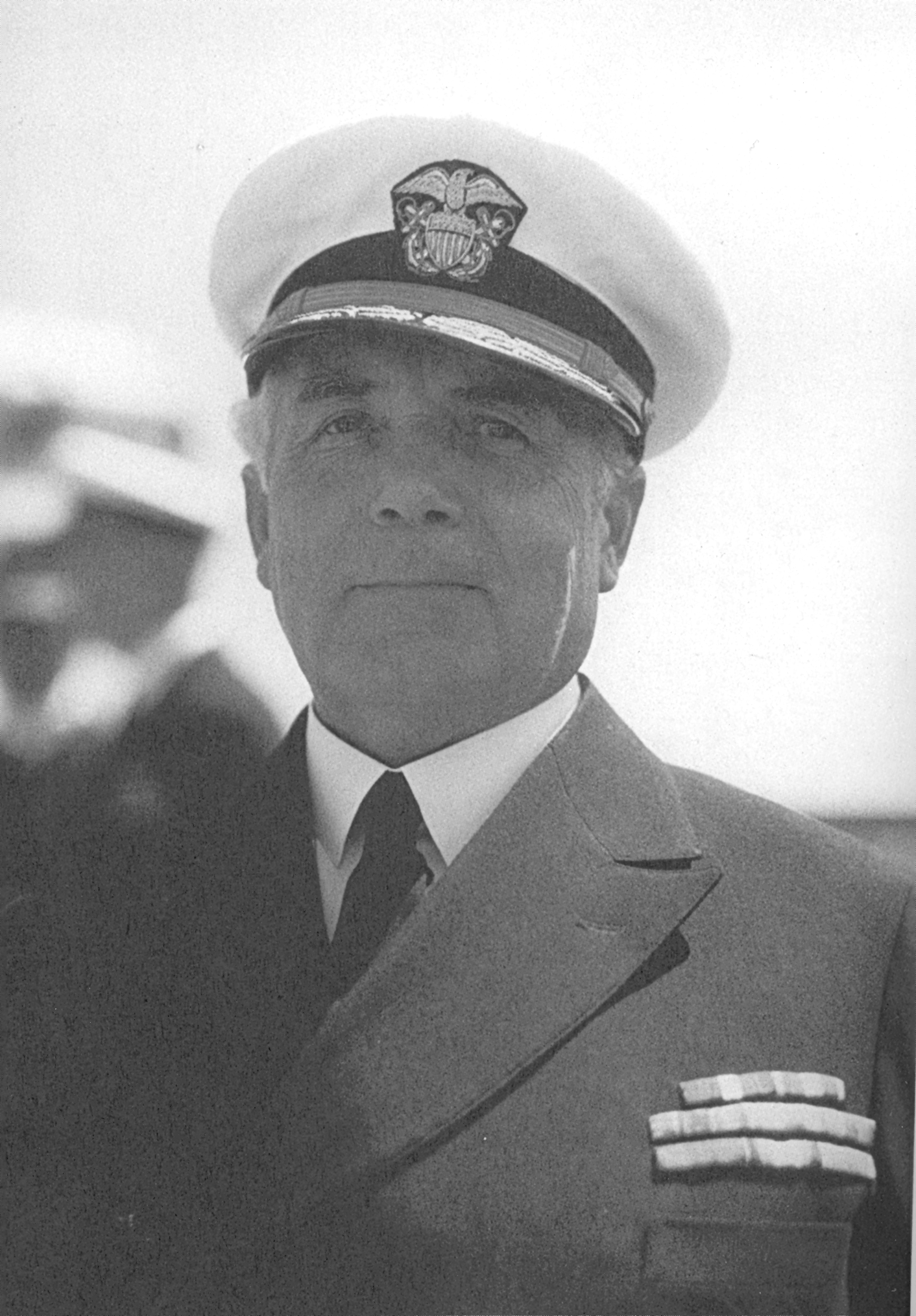
Harris Laning

=== Other sports figures ===
Name	Class year	Notability	References
John McMullen	1940	PhD in mechanical engineering; established John J. McMullen & Associates, a naval architecture and marine propulsion firm; former owner of the Houston Astros baseball team and the New Jersey Devils hockey team	
Peter S. Blair	1955	Wrestled, won back-to-back NCAA championships in 1954 and 1955; after commissioning, remained at the academy to train for the 1956 Olympic trials; as captain of the Olympic team, Blair won a bronze medal; Distinguished Member of the National Wrestling Hall of Fame	
Joe Hunt	1940s	Hunt won the 1943 US Single's Championship in tennis; was not given a leave to defend his title in 1944; died in a fighter plane accident in 1945; inducted into the International Tennis Hall of Fame	
Brian Stann	2000	Former U.S. Marine and professional mixed martial artist who competed in the UFC, former Light Heavyweight Champion of the WEC; former color commentator	
Billy Hurley	2004	PGA golfer	
Noah Song	2019	Professional baseball player	

== Attorneys ==
Name	Class year	Notability	References
Richard H. Scott	1880	Justice of the Wyoming Supreme Court	
Charles Swift	1984	Navy attorney, primary counsel in Hamdan v. Rumsfeld	
Thomas O. Marshall	1941	Associate justice and chief justice of the Supreme Court of Georgia	

== Businesspeople ==
Name	Class year	Notability	References
John McMullen	1940	PhD in mechanical engineering; established John J. McMullen & Associates, a naval architecture and marine engineering firm; former owner of the Houston Astros baseball team and the New Jersey Devils hockey team	
John Geisse	1941	Founder of Target Stores; served in USN during World War II	
Ross Perot	1953	President of his class and battalion commander; surface warfare officer; became a self-made billionaire in the computer industry; candidate for president of the United States in 1992 and 1996; heavily involved in the Vietnam War POW/MIA issue	
Ernst Volgenau	1955	USAF officer; founder and former CEO of SRA International; benefactor and former rector of George Mason University	
J. Phillip "Jack" London	1959	United States naval aviator; chairman of the board, executive chairman, and former CEO, CACI International, Inc (NYSE, Fortune 1000, national security IT & solutions corp.); boards: U.S. Naval Institute, U.S. Navy Memorial Foundation, Naval Historical Foundation, and CAUSE (wounded veterans support)	
Ron Terwilliger	1963	Chairman and CEO of Trammell Crow Residential, the largest developer of multi-family housing in the United States; principal owner of new WNBA franchise, Atlanta Dream; led team of investors that tried to buy the Atlanta Braves Major League Baseball team in 2006; former chairman of Urban Land Institute	
Richard Armitage	1967	President of Armitage International; ambassador to the new independent states of the former Soviet Union (1992–1993)	

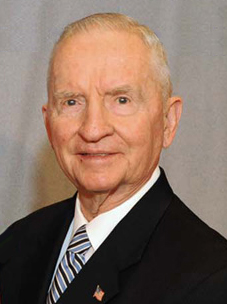
H. Ross Perot

== U.S. government ==
=== President of the United States ===
Name / Class year / Notability / References; Jimmy Carter / 1947 / 39th president of the United States (1977–1981); Nobel Peace laureate of 2002; Georgia state senator (1963–1966); 76th governor of Georgia (1971–1975); post-World War II submariner

=== U.S. cabinet members ===
Name	Class year	Notability	References
James D. Watkins	1949	Admiral; chief of Naval Operations (1982–1986); United States secretary of energy (1989–1993); chairman of United States Commission on Ocean Policy that crafted Oceans Act of 2000	
Anthony Principi	1967	Secretary of Veterans Affairs (2001–2005)	

=== Secretaries of military services ===
Name	Class year	Notability	References
Curtis D. Wilbur	1888	Secretary of the Navy (1924–1929); increased the size of the Navy and modernized it; also a federal appellate judge	
Robert B. Pirie Jr.	1955	Secretary of the Navy (acting) (2001); son of Vice Admiral Robert B. Pirie, Class of 1926	
Frank B. Kelso	1956	Admiral; chief of Naval Operations (1990–1994); Supreme Allied commander, Atlantic; submarine officer; secretary of the Navy (acting) (1993)	
John Howard Dalton	1964	Secretary of the Navy (1993–1998); banker	
James H. Webb Jr.	1968	Marine Corps officer and Vietnam veteran; United States assistant secretary of Defense for Reserve Affairs (1984–1987); secretary of the Navy (1987–1988); noted novelist of Fields of Fire and A Sense of Honor; US senator from Virginia (2006–2012)	
Thomas Modly	1983	Businessman and former government official; acting United States secretary of the Navy 2019–2020	
Carlos Del Toro	1983	Cuban-American entrepreneur and retired United States Navy officer; served as the 78th United States secretary of the Navy 2021–2025; second Hispanic American to serve as the secretary of the Navy, after Edward Hidalgo	
Kenneth J. Braithwaite	1984	Navy admiral (2007–2011); worked in the health industry until 2017, when he was nominated as the U.S. ambassador to Norway (2017–2020), secretary of the Navy (2020-2021)	

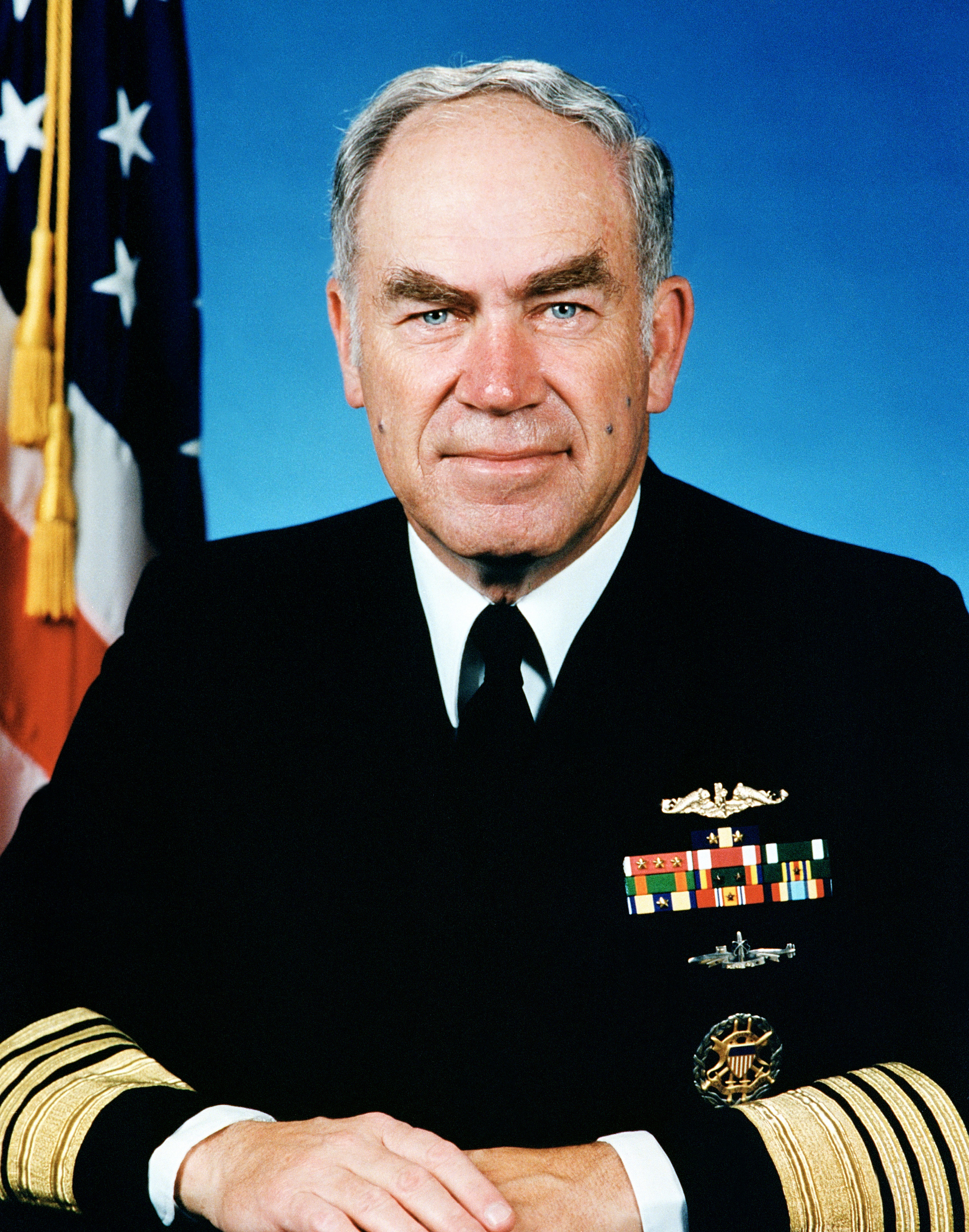
Frank Kelso

=== U.S. legislators ===
Name	Class year	Notability	References
Jeremiah Denton	1947	Rear admiral; senator from Alabama (1981–1987); naval aviator who spent almost eight years as a prisoner of war in North Vietnam	
Ronald Machtley	1970	Republican member of the United States House of Representatives from Rhode Island 1989–1995; president of Bryant University in Smithfield, Rhode Island 1996–	
John McCain	1958	Captain; U.S. senator from Arizona (1987–2018); Republican presidential nominee in 2008; Vietnam-era naval aviator and POW	
Richmond Pearson Hobson	1889	Admiral; representative from Alabama (1907–1915); recipient of the Medal of Honor for attempting to block a channel during the Spanish–American War, was taken prisoner	
Elaine Luria	1997	Commander; Democratic member of the United States House of Representatives from Virginia's 2nd district (2019–2023)	
Tim Sheehy	2008	Navy SEAL; Republican U.S. senator from Montana (2025–present)	
Mikie Sherrill	1994	Lieutenant; Democratic member of the United States House of Representatives from New Jersey's 11th district (2019–present)	
James H. Webb Jr.	1968	Senator from Virginia (2007–2013); Marine Corps officer and Vietnam veteran; United States assistant secretary of defense for Reserve Affairs (1984–1987); secretary of the Navy (1987–1988); noted novelist of Fields of Fire and A Sense of Honor	
Charles Wilson	1956	Representative from Texas (1973–1996); convinced Congress to support the largest ever CIA covert operation to supply the Afghan Mujahideen during the Soviet–Afghan War; profiled in the book and film Charlie Wilson's War	

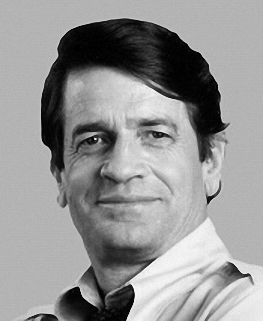
Charlie Wilson

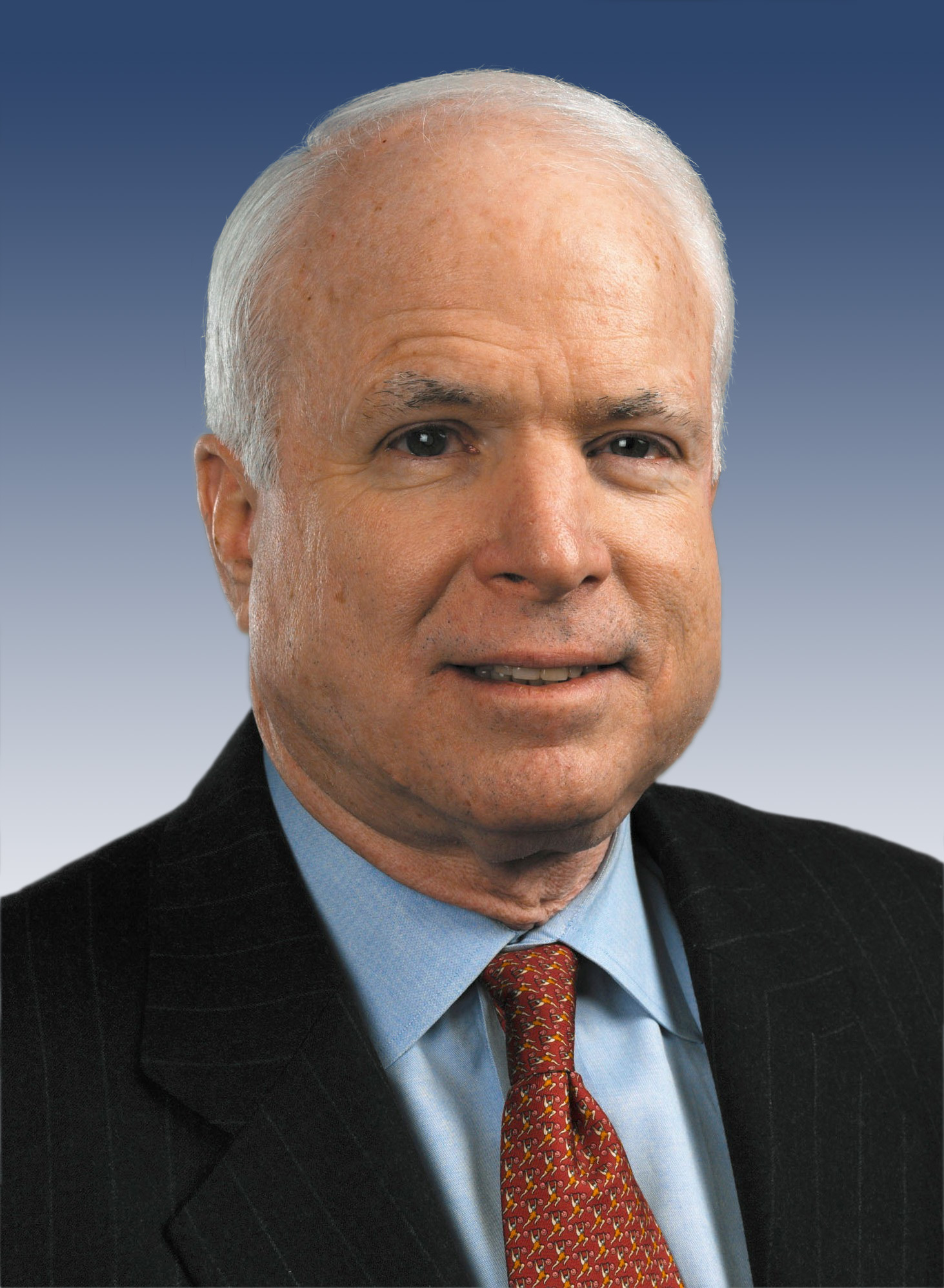
John McCain

=== National Security advisors ===
Name	Class year	Notability	References
John Poindexter	1958	National Security advisor 1985–1986; convictions, later reversed, of involvement in the Iran-Contra affair; earned a PhD in physics from the California Institute of Technology	
Robert McFarlane	1959	National Security advisor (1983–1985); convicted, later pardoned for his role in the Iran-Contra affair	
James W. Nance	1944	Rear admiral; deputy National Security advisor 1981–1982; acting National Security advisor, 1981–1982; earned an MA in international relations from George Washington University	

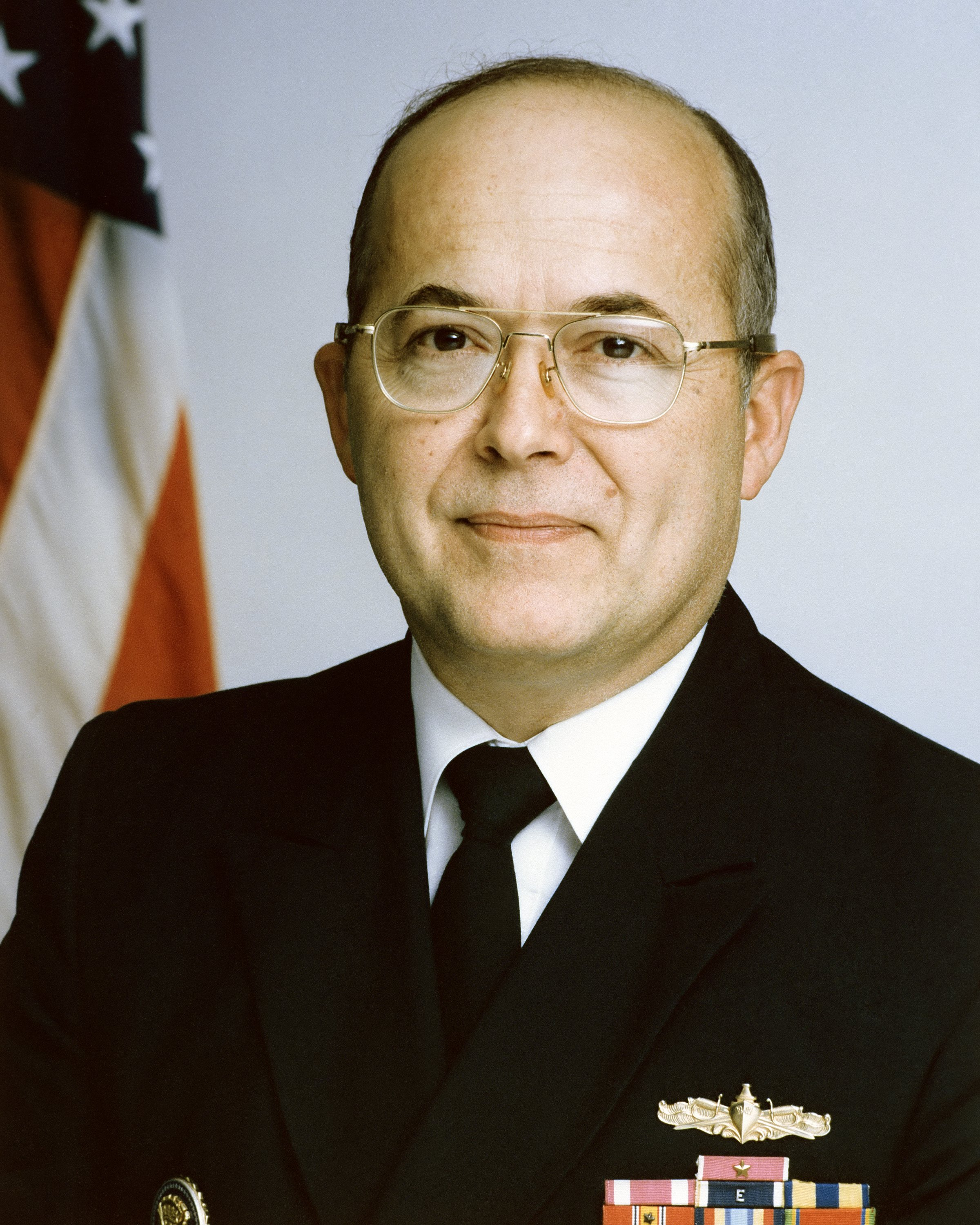
John Poindexter

=== Chairmen of the Joint Chiefs of Staff ===
Name	Class year	Notability	References
William D. Leahy	1897	Chief of Naval Operations (1937–1939); became the first fleet admiral during World War II and crafted future thought leadership; served as chief of staff to the commander in chief, which was the role model for the first chairman of the Joint Chiefs of Staff; governor of Puerto Rico (1939–1940); ambassador to the Vichy French	
Arthur W. Radford	1916	Admiral; chairman of the Joint Chiefs of Staff (1953–1957)	
Thomas Hinman Moorer	1933	Admiral; chief of Naval Operations (1967–1970); chairman of the Joint Chiefs of Staff (1970–1974)	
William J. Crowe	1947	Admiral; chairman of Joint Chiefs of Staff (1985–89); ambassador to the United Kingdom (1994–97)	
Peter Pace	1967	General; vice chairman of the Joint Chiefs of Staff (2001–2005); first U.S. Marine appointed as chairman of the Joint Chiefs of Staff (2005–2007)	
Michael Mullen	1968	Admiral; chief of Naval Operations (2005–2007); chairman of the Joint Chiefs of Staff (2007–2011)	

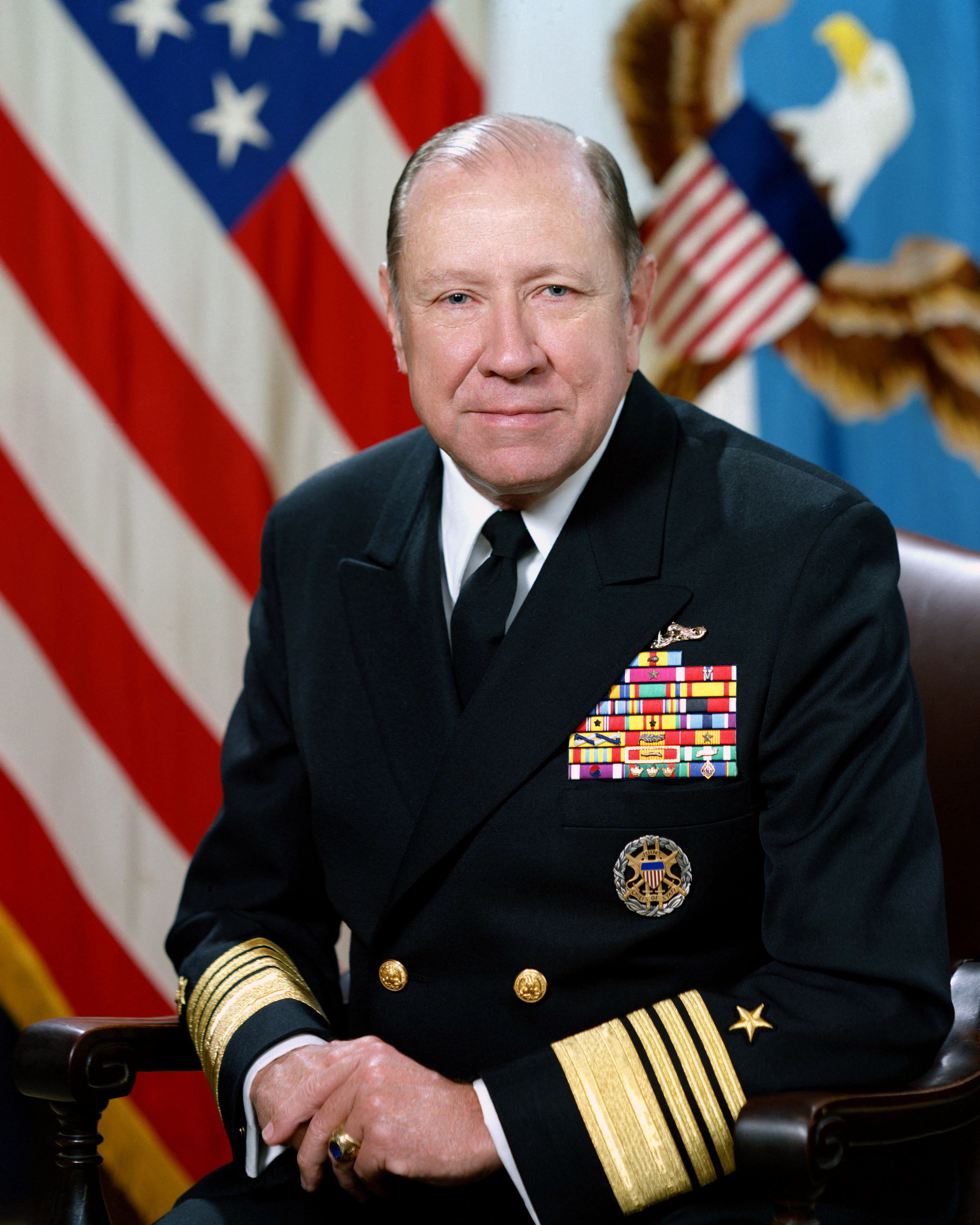
William Crowe

=== Vice chairmen of the Joint Chiefs of Staff ===
Name	Class year	Notability	References
Robert T. Herres	1954	Air Force general and fighter pilot; first vice chairman of the Joint Chiefs of Staff (1987–1990); chairman of USAA Group (1993–2002); Distinguished Eagle Scout Award recipient	
William A. Owens	1962	Admiral; submariner; vice chairman of the Joint Chiefs of Staff (1994–1996)	
Peter Pace	1967	General; vice chairman of the Joint Chiefs of Staff (2001–2005); first United States Marine appointed as chairman of the Joint Chiefs of Staff (2005–2007)	
Edmund Giambastiani	1970	Admiral; submariner; commander of United States Joint Forces Command (2002–2005); vice chairman of the Joint Chiefs of Staff (2005–2007)	

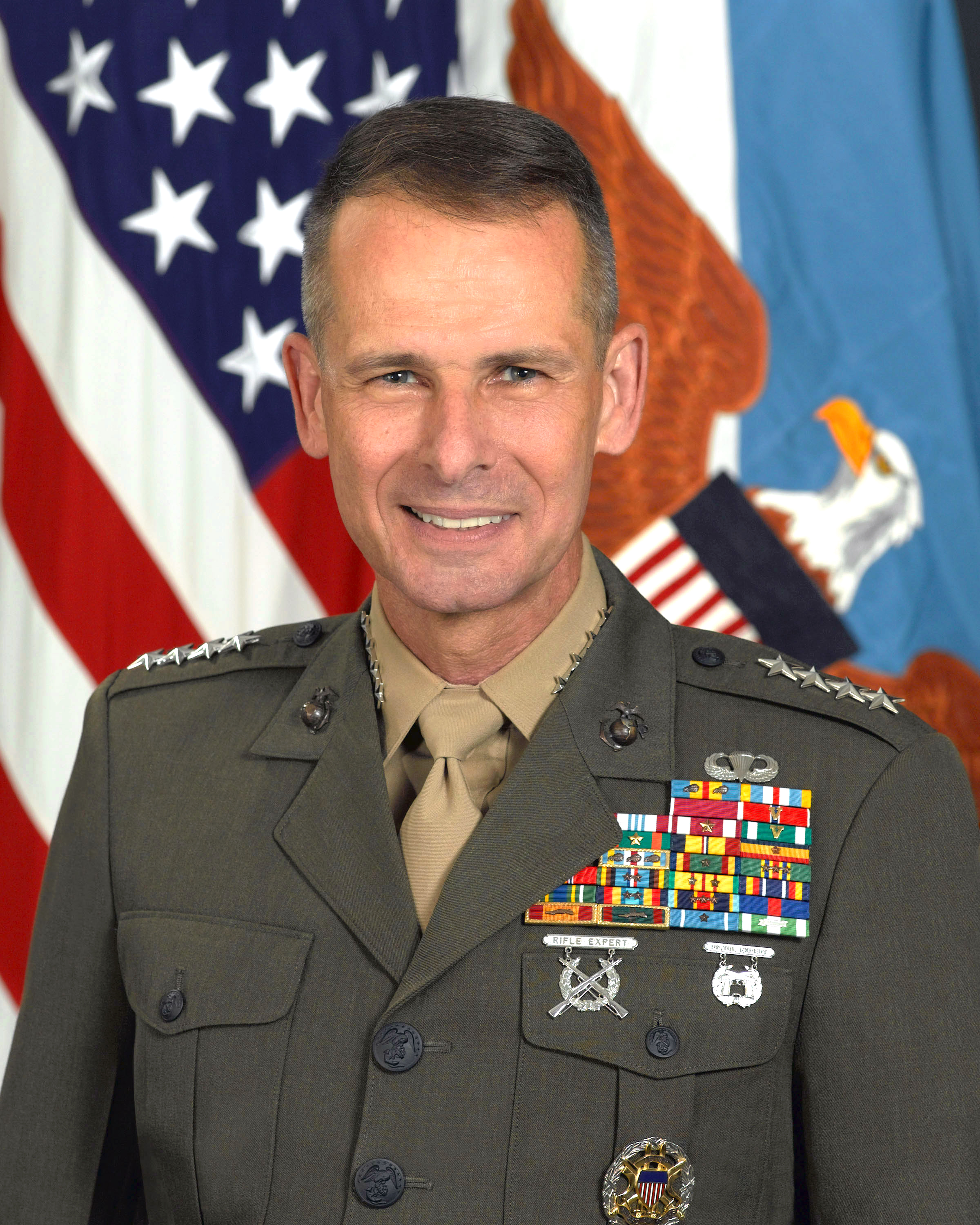
Peter Pace

=== Ambassadors ===
Name	Class year	Notability	References
William Harrison Standley	1895	Admiral; signed the London Naval Treaty of 1930 on behalf of the United States; chief of Naval Operations (1933–1937); United States ambassador to the Soviet Union (1942–44)	
William D. Leahy	1897	Chief of Naval Operations (1937–19); became the first fleet admiral during World War II and crafted "future thought leadership"; served as chief of staff to the commander in chief, which was the "role model" for the first chairman of the Joint Chiefs of Staff; governor of Puerto Rico (1939–1940); ambassador to the Vichy French	
Raymond A. Spruance	1906	Admiral; destroyer and battleship commander; commander of the United States Fifth Fleet; commander-in-chief of the United States Pacific Fleet recipient of the Navy Cross and the Navy Distinguished Service Medal; U.S. ambassador to the Philippines; USS Spruance (DDG-111), USS Spruance (DD-963), and the Spruance-class destroyer series of ships were named for him	
Alan G. Kirk	1909	United States ambassador to Belgium (1946–1949), Soviet Union (1949–1951), China (1962–1963)	
Jerauld Wright	1918	Admiral; destroyer and cruiser commander; commander of the United States Naval Forces Eastern Atlantic and Mediterranean; commander of the United States Atlantic Command; recipient of two Navy Distinguished Service Medals and the Silver Star; U.S. ambassador to the Republic of China; son of Army Lieutenant General William M. Wright	
Selden Chapin	1920	Director-general of Foreign Service (1946–1947); United States ambassador to Hungary (1947–1949), Netherlands (1949–1953), Panama (1953–1955), Iran (1955–1958), Peru (1960)	
George Anderson	1927	Admiral; chief of Naval Operations (1961–63); ambassador to Portugal (1963–66)	
Horacio Rivero Jr.	1931	First Puerto Rican and second Hispanic four-star admiral in the modern United States Navy; ambassador to Spain (1972–1974)	
William J. Crowe	1947	Admiral; chairman of Joint Chiefs of Staff (1985–89); ambassador to the United Kingdom (1994–97)	
William Anders	1955	Astronaut, flew on Apollo 8; ambassador to Norway (1975–77)	
Jack R. Binns	1956	Ambassador to Honduras (1980–81); career Foreign Service officer	
Joseph Prueher	1964	Admiral; ambassador to China (1999–2001)	
Richard Armitage	1967	President of Armitage International; ambassador to the new independent states of the former Soviet Union (1992–1993)	
Paul D Wohlers	1974	United States ambassador to Macedonia (2011–2015)	
Reuben E. Brigety, II	1995	United States ambassador to the African Union (2013–2015), current dean of the Elliott School of International Affairs	

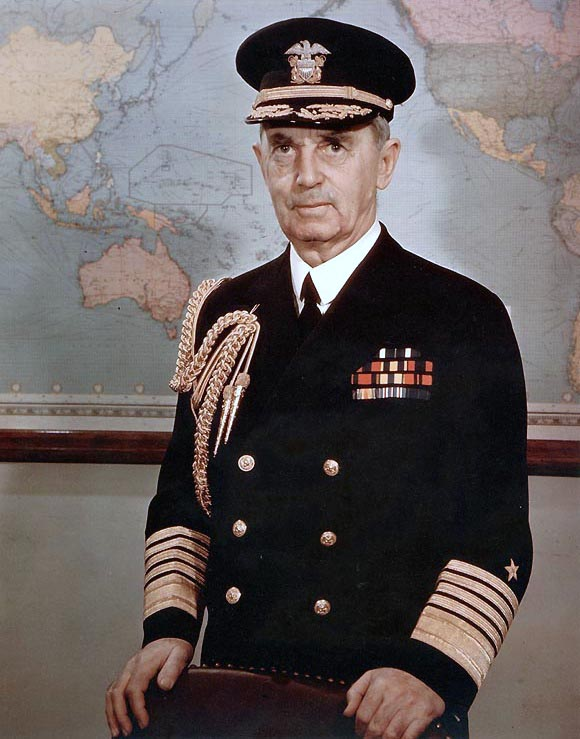
William Leahy

=== Governors ===
Name	Class year	Notability	References
Edward David Taussig	1867	1st Naval governor of Guam	
William Elbridge Sewell	1871	6th Naval governor of Guam	
Templin Potts	1876	11th Naval governor of Guam	
George Salisbury	1879	15th Naval governor of Guam	
William John Maxwell	1880	18th Naval governor of Guam (1914–1916)	
John Martin Poyer	1884	12th governor of American Samoa (1915–1919)	
Robert Coontz	1885	Admiral; chief of Naval Operations (1919–1923); governor of Guam (1912–1914)	
William Gilmer	1885	Captain; governor of Guam (1918–19) and (1919–20)	
Henry Hughes Hough	1891	Admiral; governor of the United States Virgin Islands, a role that he only acted in for a year; the first non-acting military governor to govern as a captain, rather than a rear admiral, and the first not to be born in the United States	
Henry Francis Bryan	1887	Rear admiral; 17th governor of American Samoa (1925–1927)	
William Michael Crose	1888	Commander; 7th governor of American Samoa (1910–1913)	
Adelbert Althouse	1891	Captain; 27th and 29th Naval governor of Guam (1922–1923)	
Luke McNamee	1892	10th and 12th Naval governor of Guam; admiral in charge of the Battle Fleet	
Edward Stanley Kellogg	1892	Captain; 16th governor of American Samoa (1923–1925)	
Alfred Walton Hinds	1894	Captain; 17th Naval governor of Guam (1913–1914)	
Henry Bertram Price	1895	Captain; 30th Naval governor of Guam (1923–1924)	
Stephen Victor Graham	1896	Rear admiral; 18th governor of American Samoa (1927–1929)	
Gatewood Lincoln	1896	Captain; 22nd governor of American Samoa (1931–1932)	
Ivan Wettengel	1896	Captain; 25th Naval governor of Guam (1920–21)	
William D. Leahy	1897	Chief of Naval Operations (1937–1939); became the first fleet admiral during World War II and crafted "future thought leadership"; served as chief of staff to the commander in chief, which was the role model for the first chairman of the Joint Chiefs of Staff; governor of Puerto Rico (1939–1940); ambassador to the Vichy French	
William P. Cronan	1898	Captain; 19th naval governor of Guam (1916)	
George Landenberger	1900	Captain; 23rd governor of American Samoa (1934–36)	
Frank Freyer	1902	Captain; 14th Naval governor of Guam; chief of staff of the Peruvian Navy	
Otto Dowling	1903	Captain; 25th governor of American Samoa (1932–1934)	
MacGillivray Milne	1903	Captain; 27th governor of American Samoa (1936–1938)	
Nathan Post	1904	Captain; 7th and 10th governor of American Samoa (1913 and 1914)	
Edmund Root	1905	Captain; 34th Naval governor of Guam (1931 and 1933)	
Charles Armijo Woodruff	1906	Commander; 11th governor of American Samoa (1914–15)	
George A. Alexander	1906	Captain; 35th Naval governor of Guam (1933–36)	
Willis W. Bradley	1907	Captain; governor of Guam (1929–1931); representative from California (1947–1949); Medal of Honor recipient for actions during an ammunition explosion on board USS Pittsburgh (CA-4) in 1917	
Alfred Winsor Brown	1907	Captain; governor of Guam (1924–1926)	
Lloyd C. Stark	1908	Governor of Missouri (1937–1941)	
William A. Hodgman	1908	Captain; 23rd Naval governor of Guam	
Benjamin McCandlish	1909	Commodore; 36th Naval governor of Guam	
Samuel Wilder King	1910	Representative from Hawaii (1935–1943); 11th territorial governor of Hawai'i (1953–1957)	
George McMillin	1911	Rear admiral; 38th and final naval governor of Guam (1940–41); surrendered to the Empire of Japan during the First Battle of Guam	
Laurence Wild	1913	Captain; 1913 NCAA Men's Basketball All-American; head coach of the Navy Midshipmen men's basketball team; 30th governor of American Samoa (1940–1942)	
Arthur Emerson	1916	21st governor of American Samoa	
Ralph Hungerford	1919	Captain; 33rd governor of American Samoa	
Samuel Canan	1920	34th governor of American Samoa (1945)	
John Gould Moyer	1921	Rear admiral; 31st governor of American Samoa (1942–1944)	
Harold Houser	1921	Rear admiral; 35th governor of American Samoa (1945–1947)	
Jesse Rink Wallace	1922	29th governor of American Samoa (1940)	
Vernon Huber	1922	Rear admiral; 36th governor of American Samoa (1947–1949)	
Daniel Walker	1946	Governor of Illinois (1973–1977)	
Jimmy Carter	1947	39th president of the United States (1977–1981); Nobel Peace laureate of 2002; Georgia state senator (1963–1966); 76th governor of Georgia (1971–1975); post-World War II submariner	
Frank D. White	1956	Governor of Arkansas (1981–1983); pilot in the United States Air Force	
Matt Blunt	1993	Governor of Missouri (2005–2009)	

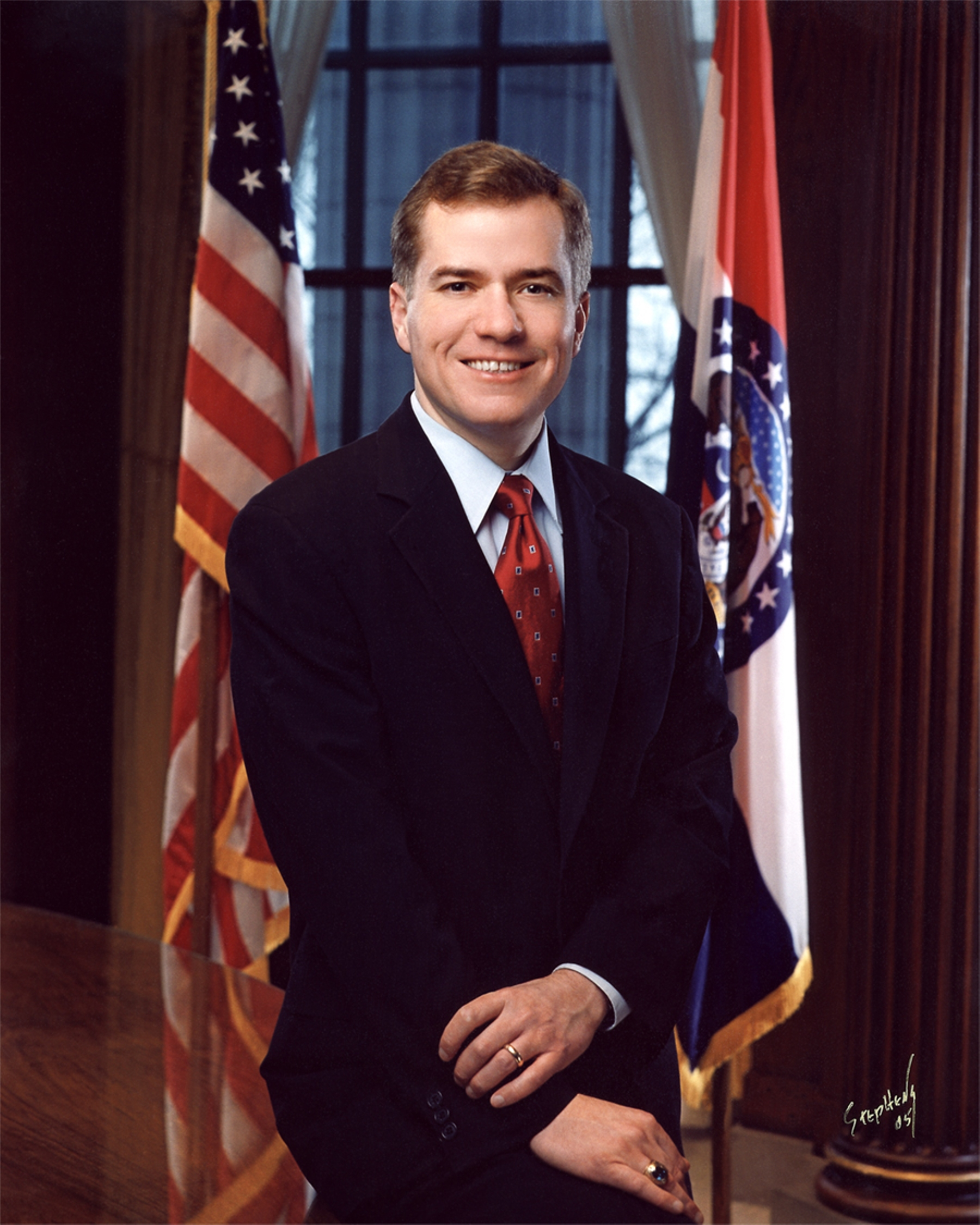
Matthew Roy Blunt

== Literary figures ==
Name	Class year	Notability	References
Yates Stirling Jr.	1872	Navy rear admiral and author, lecturer and critic of naval and foreign policy	
Donald Keyhoe	1919	Marine Corps major and aviator; author, UFO researcher	
Robert A. Heinlein	1929	Science fiction author; winner of several Hugo and Nebula Award prizes for groundbreaking science fiction	
William Lederer	1936	Science fiction writer and playwright who co-authored The Ugly American (1958)	
Edward L. Beach Jr.	1939	Author of three novels, including Run Silent, Run Deep (1955), and ten books on naval history	
P. T. Deutermann	1963	Author of at least 22 novels, including Pacific Glory (2011), for which he received the W.Y. Boyd Literary Award for Excellence in Military Fiction by the American Library Association	
James H. Webb Jr.	1968	Marine Corps officer and Vietnam veteran; United States Assistant Secretary of Defense for Reserve Affairs (1984–1987); Secretary of the Navy (1987–88); noted novelist of Fields of Fire and A Sense of Honor; US Senator from Virginia (2006–2012)	
Jonathan P. Brazee	1979	Marine Corps infantry colonel; speculative fiction author of over 40 novels; winner of two Nebula Award science fiction prizes	

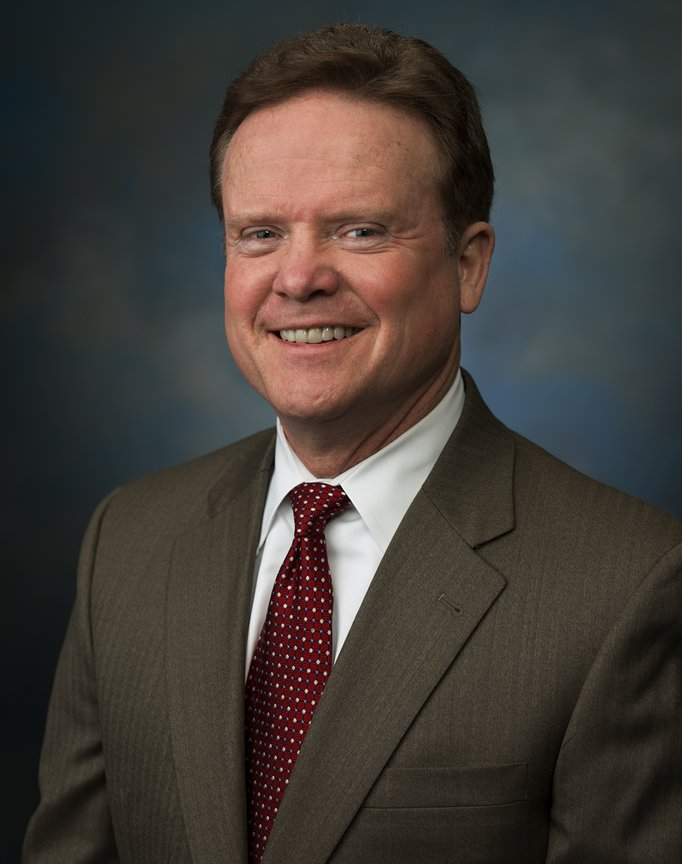
Jim Webb

== Military figures ==
=== Chiefs of Naval Operations ===
Name	Class year	Notability	References
William S. Benson	1877	Admiral; first chief of Naval Operations (CNO) (1915–1919); defined the functions of the new CNO position and strengthened the Navy	
William D. Leahy	1897	First Fleet admiral; chief of Naval Operations (1937–1939), during World War II; became the first fleet admiral and crafted "future thought leadership"; chief of staff to the commander in chief, which was the role model for the first chairman of the Joint Chiefs of Staff; governor of Puerto Rico (1939–1940); ambassador to Vichy France	
Chester W. Nimitz	1905	Fleet admiral; held the dual command of commander-in-chief, United States Pacific Fleet (CinCPac), for U.S. naval forces and commander in chief, Pacific Ocean Areas (CinCPOA), for U.S. and Allied air, land, and sea forces during World War II; chief of Naval Operations (1945–1947)	
Arleigh Burke	1923	Admiral; chief of Naval Operations (1955–1961); carrier and destroyer commander during World War II; Korean War veteran; Arleigh Burke-class of destroyers was named after him	
Elmo R. Zumwalt Jr.	1942	Admiral; chief of Naval Operations (1970–1974); destroyer service during World War II, Korean War service aboard USS Wisconsin; destroyer and guided-missile frigate commander; commanded brown-water Cruiser-Destroyer Flotilla Seven during Vietnam War; as CNO, undertook initiatives to modernize service personnel policies and upgrade the fleet by increased construction of missile patrol boats and guided missile frigates; Zumwalt-class of destroyers was named after him	
Carlisle Trost	1953	Admiral; chief of Naval Operations (1986–1990); submarine officer; graduated first in his class; Olmsted Scholar	
Frank Kelso	1956	Admiral; chief of Naval Operations (1990–1994); Supreme Allied commander, Atlantic; submarine officer; secretary of the Navy (acting) (1993)	
Jay L. Johnson	1968	Admiral; chief of Naval Operations (1996–2000); aviator	
Michael Mullen	1968	Admiral; chief of Naval Operations (2005–2007); chairman of the Joint Chiefs of Staff (2007–11)	
Gary Roughead	1973	Admiral; chief of Naval Operations (2007–2011); surface warfare officer (SWO)	
Jonathan Greenert	1975	Admiral; chief of Naval Operations (2011–2015); submarine warfare officer (SS)	
John M. Richardson	1982	Admiral; chief of Naval Operations (2015–2019); director of Navy Nuclear Propulsion (2012–2015); submarine warfare officer (SS)	
Michael Gilday	1985	Admiral; chief of Naval Operations (2019–present); surface warfare officer (SWO)	

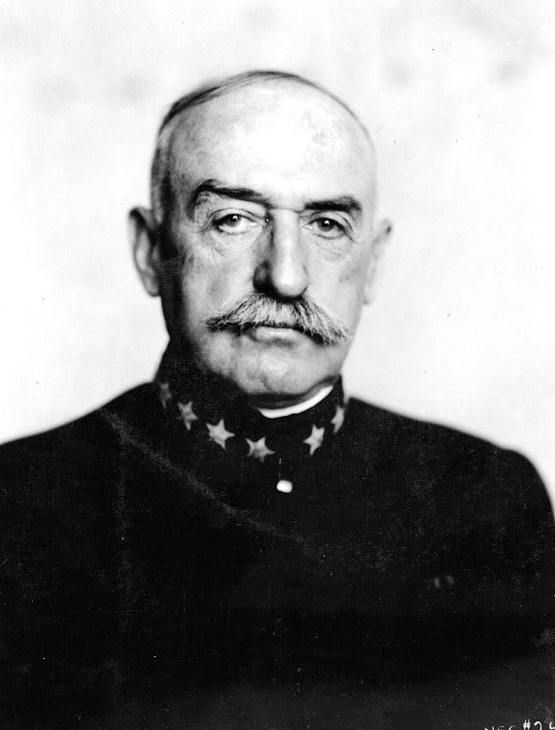
William Benson

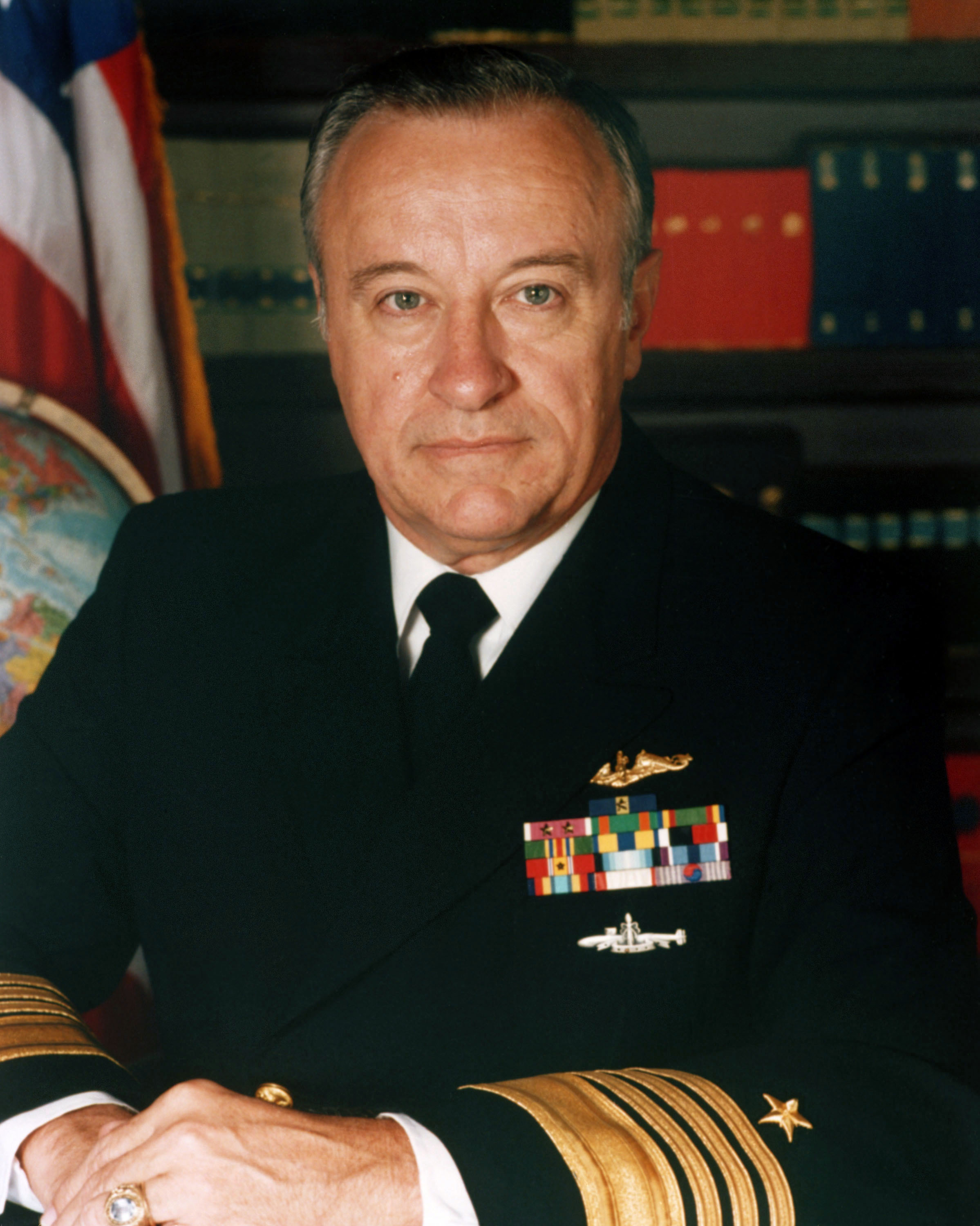
Carlisle Trost

=== Commandants of the Marine Corps ===
Name	Class year	Notability	References F
George Barnett	1881	Major general; 12th commandant of the Marine Corps (1914–20); served in Cuba, China, Philippines	
John A. Lejeune	1888	Lieutenant general; World War I Army Division commander; 13th commandant of the Marine Corps (1920–1929); superintendent of the Virginia Military Institute (1929–37)	
Ben Hebard Fuller	1889	Major general; commandant of the Marine Corps (1930–1934); served in Cuba, China, Philippines; son Edward Fuller, Naval Academy Class of 1916, Marine captain, killed at Belleau Wood in World War I	
Wendell Cushing Neville	1890	Major general; recipient of the Medal of Honor for leadership during ground combat during the landings at United States occupation of Veracruz in April 1914; commandant of the Marine Corps (1929–1930)	
John H. Russell Jr.	1892	Major general; commandant of the Marine Corps (1934–1936); father John Henry Russell member of Naval Academy Class of 1848	
Wallace M. Greene	1930	General; commandant of the Marine Corps (1964–1967) during the early Vietnam War; founding member of the Marine Corps Heritage Foundation	
Robert E. Cushman Jr.	1935	General; commandant of the Marine Corps (1972–1975) during the late Vietnam War; Navy Cross recipient for actions during Battle of Guam	
Charles C. Krulak	1964	General; commandant of the Marine Corps (1994–1997); served two tours of duty in the Vietnam War	
Michael W. Hagee	1968	General; commandant of the Marine Corps (2003–2006); served in the Vietnam War	

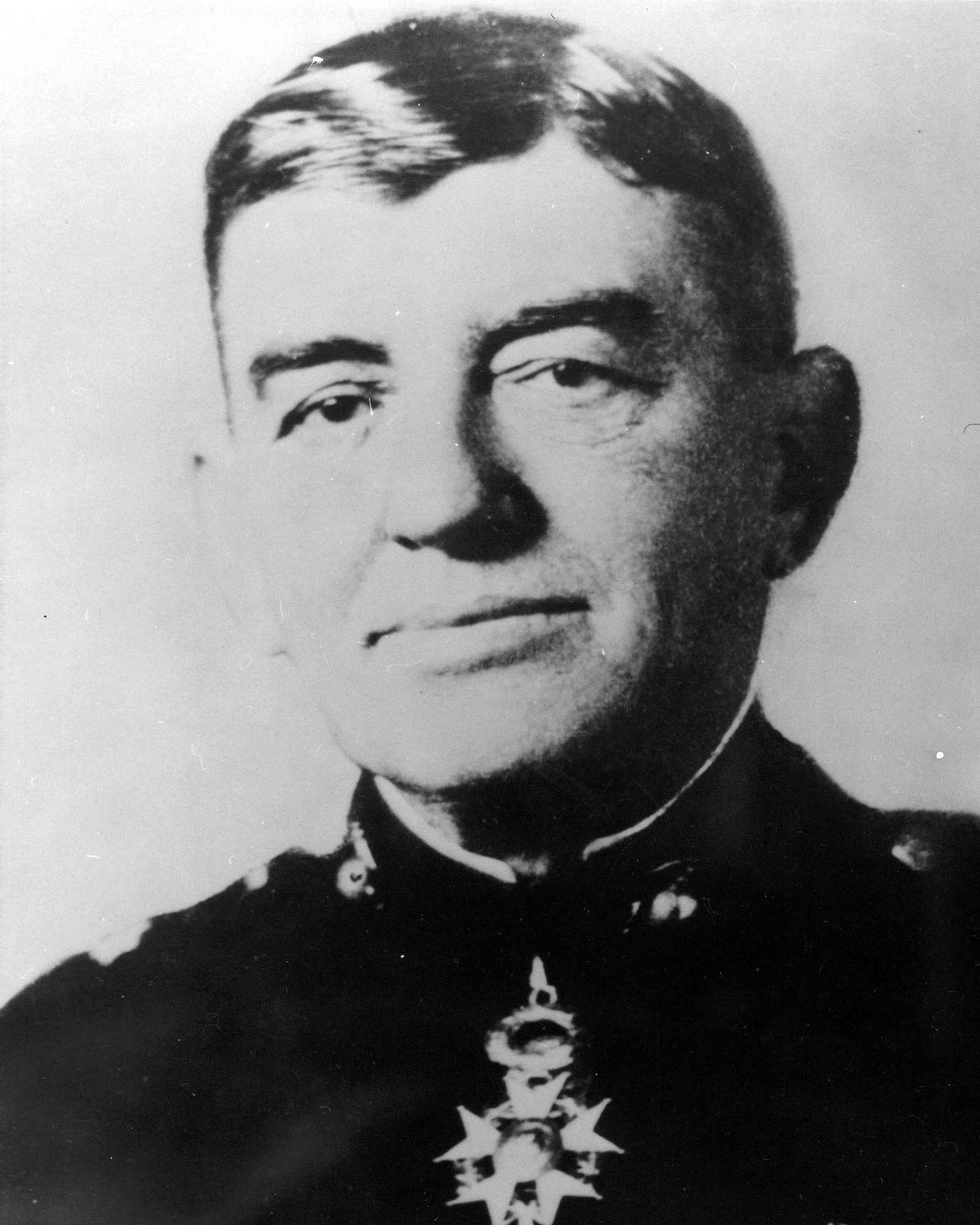
John A. Lejeune

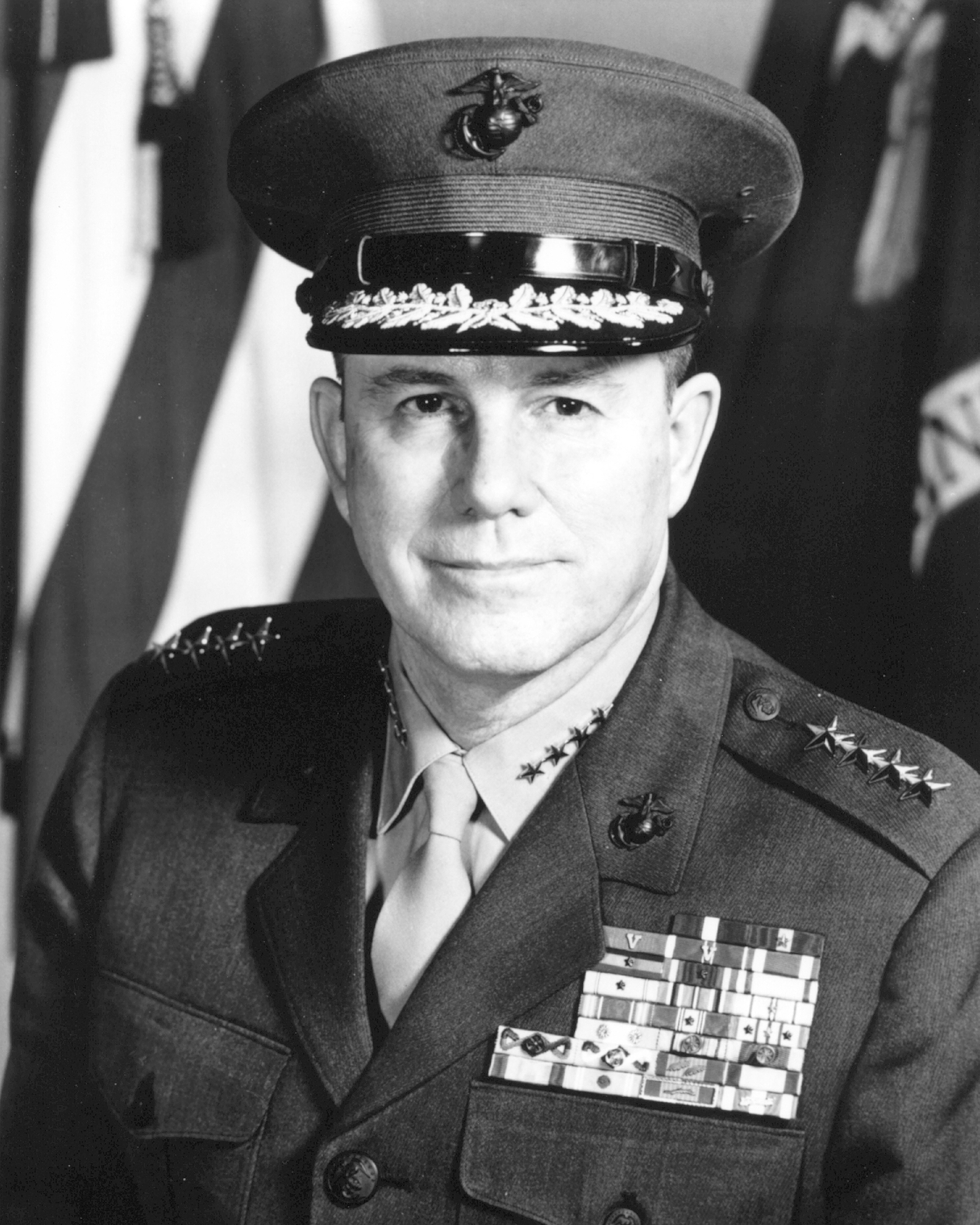
Robert Cushman

=== Confederate States Navy officers ===
Name	Class year	Notability	References
John Mercer Brooke	1847	Engineer, scientist, and educator; instrumental in the creation of the Transatlantic Cable; noted marine and military innovator; after joining the Confederate States Navy he supervised the establishment of the Confederate States Naval Academy in 1862 and 1863	
James Iredell Waddell	1847	Instructor at the US Naval Academy; chose to serve the Confederacy in their strategy of commerce raiding; captained CSS Shenandoah which destroyed or captured 38 ships and took over 1,000 prisoners, all without firing a single shot in anger or injuring any person	
William Harwar Parker	1848	Naval Academy instructor and professor of Mathematics, Navigation and Astronomy (1853–1857); after the American Civil War started, he served with the Virginia State Navy, and then the Confederacy and Confederate States Naval Academy by serving as its superintendent from October, 1863 on the school ship CSS Patrick Henry, located outside of Richmond, Virginia on the James River, Virginia; in April 1865, as the Confederate capital at Richmond, Virginia was evacuated, he led the C.S. Naval Academy's midshipmen as a guard for their failing government's archives and treasury	
John W. Dunnington	1855	Commanded three Confederate vessels during the American Civil War: the gunboats CSS Tuscarora and CSS Pontchartrain and the ironclad CSS Virginia II; as colonel in the Confederate States Army, was chief of ordnance for the Trans-Mississippi Department for several months in 1862 and commanded a brigade at the Battle of Arkansas Post in 1863	

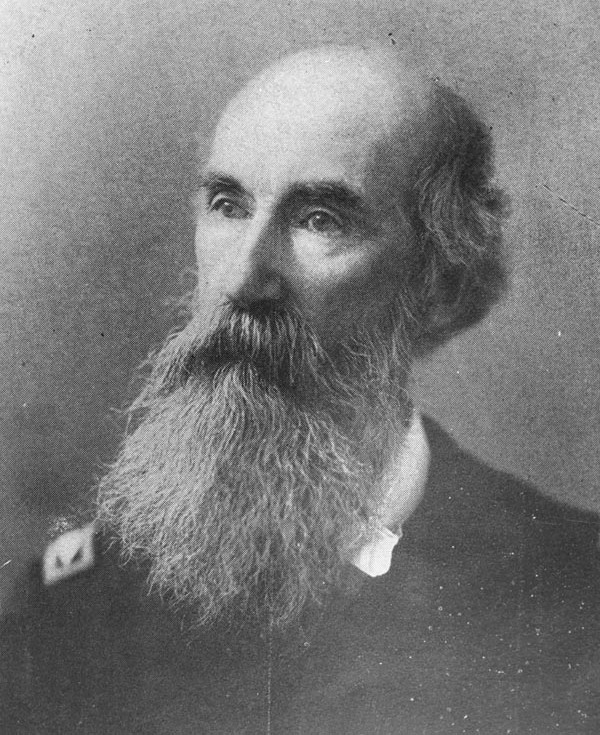
John Mercer Brooke

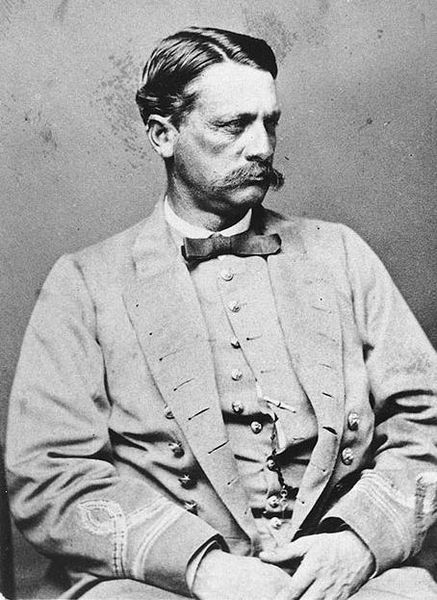
James Iredell Waddell

=== Union Navy officers ===
Name	Class year	Notability	References
George Dewey	1858	Only person to hold the rank of admiral of the Navy; American Civil War and Spanish–American War; Battle of New Orleans; won Battle of Manila Bay without loss of life due to combat among his own forces	
William B. Cushing	1861 ex	Commander; forced to resign from the Academy in the spring of his senior year due to poor grades and conduct but reinstated as an officer after the American Civil War began; sank the Confederate ironclad CSS Albemarle during a nighttime raid, a feat for which he received the Thanks of Congress	
Yates Stirling	1864	Rear admiral; gunboat and cruiser commander; commander of the Asiatic Squadron; father of Rear Admiral Yates Stirling Jr.	
Theodore Frelinghuysen Jewell	1865	Rear admiral; American Civil War and Spanish–American War; Battle of Manila Bay	

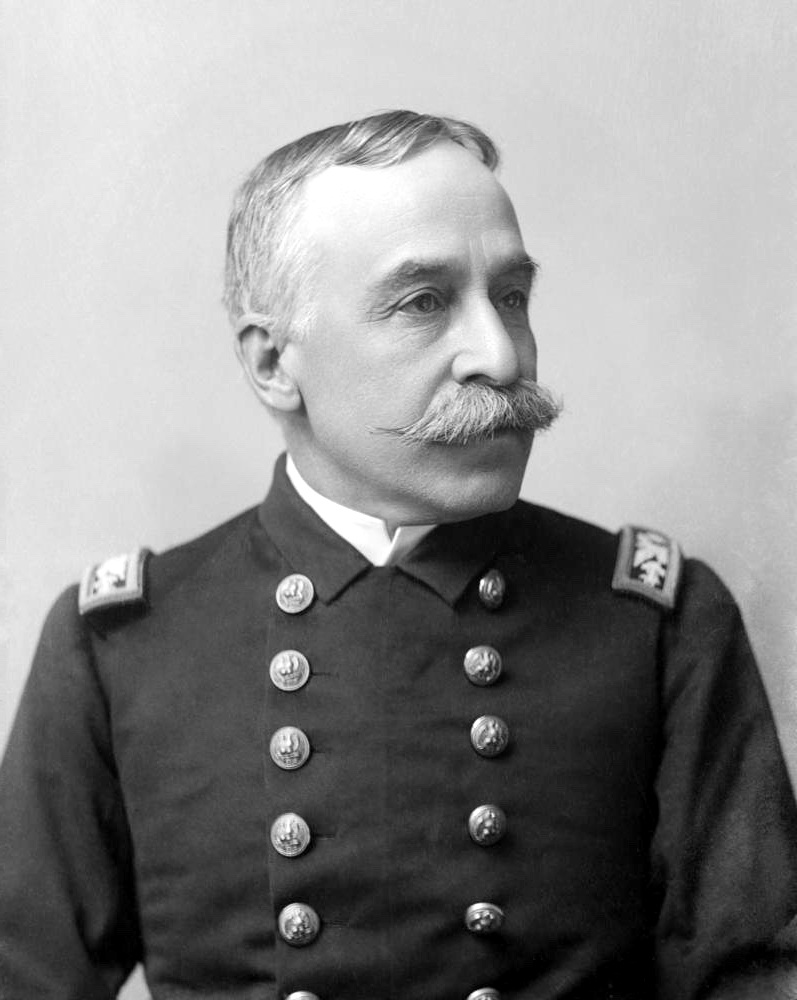
George Dewey

=== Spanish–American War combatants ===
Name	Class year	Notability	References
George Dewey	1858	Only person to hold the rank of admiral of the Navy; American Civil War and Spanish–American War; Battle of New Orleans; won Battle of Manila Bay without loss of life due to combat among his own forces	
Winfield Scott Schley	1860	Rear admiral; Civil War veteran; instructor at the Academy (1867–69) and head of department of modern languages (1872–75); commander of the Flying Squadron of ships in the Spanish–American War	
William T. Sampson	1861	Rear admiral; Civil War veteran; instructor at the Academy (1861–64); superintendent of the Academy (1886–1889); won the Battle of Santiago de Cuba during the Spanish–American War	
Charles Dwight Sigsbee	1863	Rear admiral; captain of USS Maine when it exploded in Havana harbor in 1898; commanded squadron which returned body of John Paul Jones from France to the Academy in 1905	
Gottfried Blocklinger	1868	Executive officer on board USS Charleston during the capture of Guam to the United States during the Spanish–American War in 1898	
James Kelsey Cogswell	1868	Rear admiral; USS Cogswell was named after him and his son Captain Francis Cogswell; brother-in-law of U.S. Senator John L. Mitchell and uncle of Army Air Service Major General Billy Mitchell	
Frank Matteson Bostwick	1877	Commodore; cruiser and yacht commander; commander of the Portsmouth Naval Shipyard	
Louis McCoy Nulton	1889	Admiral; gunboat, armored cruiser, and battleship commander; commandant of the Philadelphia Naval Shipyard; superintendent of the United States Naval Academy; commander-in-chief of Battle Fleet; recipient of the Navy Cross	
Arthur L. Willard	1891	As an ensign became first American to plant U.S. flag on Cuban soil during the conflict;Later earned the Navy Cross as commandant of Washington Navy Yard in World War I; commanded U.S. Navy Scouting Force (1930–1932) and Fifth Naval District (1932–1935)	
Wat Tyler Cluverius Jr.	1896	Rear admiral; the last living surviving officer of the sinking of USS Maine; commandant of Midshipmen at the Naval Academy 1919–1921; president of Worcester Polytechnic Institute	

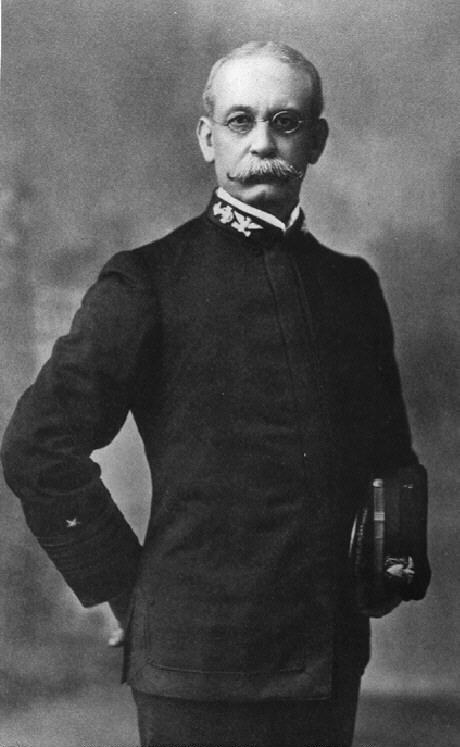
Charles Sigsbee

=== Boxer Rebellion combatants ===
Name	Class year	Notability	References
Newt H. Hall	1895	Marine Corps officer who received the Marine Corps Brevet Medal for bravery during the Boxer Rebellion	
John Twiggs Myers	1892	United States Marine Corps lieutenant general who served as an American Legation Guard in Peking during the Boxer Rebellion; awarded the Marine Corps Brevet Medal for bravery.	
William G. Powell	1893	United States Marine Corps brigadier general awarded the Marine Corps Brevet Medal for bravery during the Boxer Rebellion	

=== World War I combatants ===
Name	Class year	Notability	References
Frank E. Beatty	1875	Rear admiral; cruiser and battleship commander; commandant of the Norfolk Naval Shipyard; USS Beatty (DD-640) and USS Beatty (DD-756) were named for him; father of Vice Admiral Frank Edmund Beatty Jr.	
Albert W. Grant	1877	Vice admiral; battleship, steam tanker, and submarine commander; commander of the United States Atlantic Fleet; USS Albert W. Grant was named after him	
Hugh Rodman	1880	Admiral; gunboat, protected cruiser, and battleship commander; commander-in-chief of the United States Pacific Fleet; USS Rodman and USS Admiral Hugh Rodman were named after him	
Washington L. Capps	1884	Rear admiral; constructor of the Navy; chief of the Bureau of Construction and Repair; recipient of the Navy Distinguished Service Medal; USS Capps and the USS Admiral W. L. Capps were named for him	
Nathan C. Twining	1889	Rear admiral; protected cruiser commander; USS Twining was named in his honor; the uncle of Chairman of the Joint Chiefs of Staff Nathan Farragut Twining and Marine Corps General Merrill B. Twining	
Montgomery M. Taylor	1890	Admiral; gunboat, cruiser, and battleship commander; recipient of the Distinguished Service Medal; great-nephew of U.S. President Zachary Taylor; grandson of Army Brigadier General Montgomery C. Meigs; cousin of Army General Montgomery Meigs	
Carl Theodore Vogelgesang	1890	Rear admiral; yacht, protected cruiser, and battleship commander; recipient of the Navy Cross; USS Vogelgesang (DE-284) and USS Vogelgesang (DD-862) were named for him	
George Washington Williams	1890	Rear admiral; protected cruiser, battleship, and light cruiser commander; recipient of the Navy Cross; USS Williams (DE-290) and USS Williams (DE-372) were named for him	
Yates Stirling Jr.	1892	Rear admiral; destroyer and submarine commander; commander of the Yangtze Patrol; son of Rear Admiral Yates Stirling	
Edward Hale Campbell	1893	Vice admiral; Judge Advocate General; protected cruiser commander; commander of the Naval Training Station, Newport; recipient of the Navy Cross	
Joseph M. Reeves	1894	Admiral; collier, protected cruiser, and battleship commander; commander-in-chief of the United States Fleet; recipient of the Navy Cross; USS Reeves was named for him	
Arthur MacArthur III	1896	Captain; submarine, destroyer, minelayer, armored cruiser, and light cruiser commander; recipient of the Navy Cross and the Distinguished Service Medal; grandson of Wisconsin Governor Arthur MacArthur Sr.; son of army lieutenant general and Medal of Honor recipient Arthur MacArthur Jr.; brother of army general and Medal of Honor recipient Douglas MacArthur; father of U.S. diplomat Douglas MacArthur II (son-in-law of U.S. Vice President Alben W. Barkley; and son-in-law of Rear Admiral Bowman H. McCalla	
Walter E. Reno	1905	Lieutenant commander; destroyer commander; recipient of the Navy Cross; USS Reno was named for him	
Riley Franklin McConnell	1909	Captain; light cruiser commander; recipient of the Navy Cross; USS McConnell was named for him	
Zachary Lansdowne	1911	Lieutenant commander; airship commander; recipient of the Navy Cross; USS Lansdowne was named for him	
Frederick Lois Riefkohl	1911	Rear admiral; first Puerto Rican to graduate from the Academy; Navy Cross recipient for actions against a German submarine in World War I; captain of USS Vincennes, which was sunk at the Battle of Savo Island in 1942 during World War II	
Stanton Frederick Kalk	1916	Lieutenant (junior grade); recipient of the Distinguished Service Medal (posthumously) for his actions after his ship, USS Jacob Jones (DD-61), was torpedoed by a German submarine; two destroyers, USS Kalk (DD-170) and USS Kalk (DD-611), were named for him	

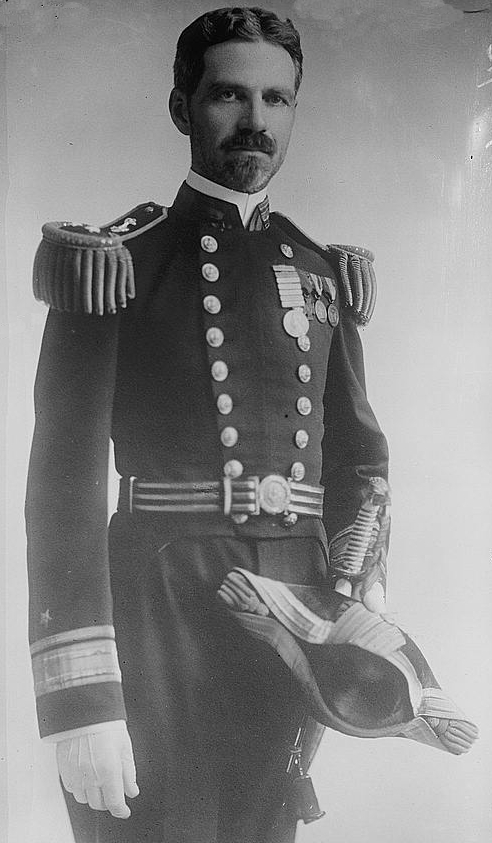
Nathan Twining

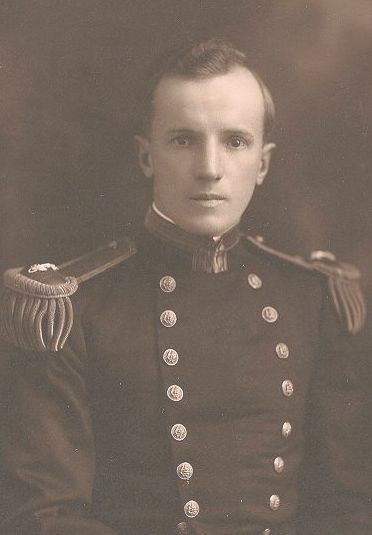
Frederick Riefkohl

=== Spanish Civil War combatant ===
Name / Class year / Notability / References; Frank Glasgow Tinker / 1933 / Top American ace (mercenary) during the Spanish Civil War

=== World War II combatants ===
Name	Class year	Notability	References
William D. Leahy	1897	Chief of Naval Operations (1937–39); became the first admiral of the Fleet during World War II and crafted "future thought leadership"; served as chief of staff to the Commander in Chief, the role model for the first chairman of the Joint Chiefs of Staff; governor of Puerto Rico (1939–1940); ambassador to Vichy France; father of Rear Admiral William Harrington Leahy	
Alfred Wilkinson Johnson	1899	Vice admiral; destroyer, light cruiser, and battleship commander; director of Naval Intelligence; commander of the Atlantic Squadron; recipient of the Distinguished Service Medal; U.S. minister to Nicaragua; married to the great-niece of U.S. Senator Ira Harris and father-in-law of U.S. Ambassador Charles Burke Elbrick	
Julius A. Furer	1901	Rear admiral; recipient of the Navy Cross; USS Julius A. Furer was named for him	
Ernest King	1901	Fleet admiral; chief of Naval Operations in World War II (1942–45)	
William "Bull" Halsey Jr.	1904	Fleet admiral; commander of the United States Third Fleet during part of the Pacific War against Japan	
Chester W. Nimitz	1905	Fleet admiral; held the dual command of commander-in-chief, United States Pacific Fleet (CinCPac), for U.S. naval forces and commander in chief, Pacific Ocean Areas (CinCPOA), for U.S. and Allied air, land, and sea forces during World War II; chief of Naval Operations (1945–47)	
Harold Medberry Bemis	1906	Rear admiral; recipient of the Navy Distinguished Service Medal	
Frank Jack Fletcher	1906	Admiral; recipient of the Medal of Honor for saving hundreds of refugees during the United States occupation of Veracruz in April 1914; operational commander at the pivotal Battles of Coral Sea and of Midway; nephew of Admiral Frank Friday Fletcher	
Henry Kent Hewitt	1906	Admiral; recipient of the Navy Cross commanding USS Cummings during World War I; commander of the United States Eighth Fleet through the amphibious invasions of Casablanca, Gela, Salerno, and Southern France	
John S. McCain Sr.	1906	Vice admiral, posthumously promoted to admiral; pioneer of aircraft carrier operations; commanded Fast Carrier Task Force in World War II; he and his son John S. McCain Jr. are the first father-son four-star Admirals in US Navy history; grandfather of John S. McCain III, also an Academy graduate; and 1908 Republican presidential candidate	
Raymond A. Spruance	1906	Admiral; destroyer and battleship commander; commander of the United States Fifth Fleet; commander-in-chief of the United States Pacific Fleet recipient of the Navy Cross and the Navy Distinguished Service Medal; U.S. ambassador to the Philippines; USS Spruance (DDG-111), USS Spruance (DD-963), and Spruance-class destroyer series of ships were named for him	
Jonas H. Ingram	1907	Admiral; recipient of the Medal of Honor for courage and leadership in handling an artillery and machine gun battalion during the United States occupation of Veracruz in April 1914; Navy Cross recipient for actions during World War I; commander, United States Atlantic Fleet during World War II; football player and head football coach at the Academy	
Thomas C. Kinkaid	1908	Admiral; commander of U.S. 7th Fleet; commander of Eastern Sea Frontier and the Atlantic Reserve Fleet	
Hugh J. Knerr	1908	Major general; observation squadron commander; commander of the Air Technical Service Command; recipient of the Distinguished Service Medal, Legion of Merit, and Bronze Star Medal	
Robert Grimes Coman	1909	Commodore, destroyer, collier, and battleship commander	
Theodore S. Wilkinson	1909	Vice admiral; recipient of the Medal of Honor for courage and leadership during the United States occupation of Veracruz in April 1914; veteran of World War I and World War II; director of Office of Naval Intelligence when Pearl Harbor was attacked in 1941	
Marc Mitscher	1910	Admiral; recipient of three Navy Crosses; commander of the Fast Carrier Task Force in World War II; commander-in-chief, U.S. Atlantic Fleet	
George McMillin	1911	Rear admiral; 38th and final naval governor of Guam (1940–41); surrendered to the Empire of Japan during the First Battle of Guam	
Charles A. Lockwood	1912	Vice admiral; gunboat, destroyer, and submarine commander; recipient of three Navy Distinguished Service medals; USS Lockwood was named for him	
Pedro del Valle	1915	First Hispanic Marine Corps officer to reach the rank of lieutenant general; served in World War I, Haiti, and Nicaragua during the so-called Banana Wars of the 1920s, the seizure of Guadalcanal, and later as commanding general of the U.S. 1st Marine Division during World War II	
Frank Edmund Beatty Jr.	1916	Vice admiral; destroyer and light cruiser commander; recipient of the Navy Cross; son of Rear Admiral Frank E. Beatty	
Charles L. Carpenter	1926	Rear admiral; attack transport commander; recipient of the Navy Cross	
Ralph A. Ofstie	1919	Vice admiral; aircraft carrier commander; deputy chief of Naval Operations; was married to Captain Joy Bright Hancock	
Joseph J. Clark	1917	First Native cadet (Cherokee) to graduate USNA; Admiral; aircraft carrier commander; 7th Fleet commander	
John W. Roper	1918	Vice admiral; battleship commander; recipient of the Legion of Merit	
Earl E. Stone	1918	Rear admiral; battleship commander; chief of Naval Communications; commandant of the Naval Postgraduate School; recipient of two Legions of Merit	
Jerauld Wright	1918	Admiral; destroyer and cruiser commander; commander of the United States Naval Forces Eastern Atlantic and Mediterranean; commander of the United States Atlantic Command; recipient of two Navy Distinguished Service Medals and the Silver Star; U.S. ambassador to the Republic of China; son of Army Lieutenant General William M. Wright	
Winfield S. Cunningham	1919	Rear admiral; officer in charge of U.S. forces during the Battle of Wake Island; seaplane tender commander; recipient of the Navy Cross	
Charles B. McVay III	1920	Rear admiral; captain of USS Indianapolis, which was sunk by a Japanese submarine in World War II and lost most of its crew to shark attacks after delivering nuclear bomb parts to Tinian	
Walter Schindler	1921	Vice admiral; recipient of the Navy Cross and the Silver Star	
Rodger W. Simpson	1921	Rear admiral; recipient of two Navy Crosses; destroyer commander	
Irving Wiltsie	1921	Captain; seaplane tender and escort carrier commander; recipient of the Navy Cross and the Silver Star; USS Wiltsie was named for him	
John Higgins	1922	Rear admiral; recipient of the Navy Cross, the Navy Distinguished Service Medal, the Silver Star, and two Legions of Merit	
Merrill B. Twining	1923	General; chief of staff of the United States Marine Corps Forces Pacific; nephew of Rear Admiral Nathan C. Twining and brother of Chairman of the Joint Chiefs of Staff Nathan Farragut Twining	
Clarence Ekstrom	1924	Vice admiral; recipient of the Navy Cross; escort carrier commander	
Henry C. Bruton	1926	Rear admiral; submarine and battleship commander; director of Naval Communications; recipient of the three Navy Crosses and two Legions of Merit	
Elmer Salzman	1926	Major general; recipient of the Navy Cross	
James H. Flatley	1929	Vice admiral; aviator; recipient of the Navy Cross, the Navy Distinguished Service Medal, and the Silver Star; USS Flatley was named for him	
Warner S. Rodimon	1929	Captain, rear admiral; recipient of the Silver Star, the Bronze Star; captain of USS Hopewell during retaking of Corregidor	
William T. Nelson	1930	Rear admiral; submarine commander	
Marvin John Jensen	1931	Rear admiral; submarine commander; recipient of the Silver Star	
John O. Miner	1931	Rear admiral; destroyer and battleship commander; U.S. Naval attaché in Rome, Italy; recipient of the Silver Star and Legion of Merit	
Louis Joseph Kirn	1932	Rear admiral; aviator; recipient of the Navy Cross, the Navy Distinguished Service Medal, and the Distinguished Flying Cross	
Edmond Konrad	1932	Rear admiral; recipient of two Navy Crosses and the Silver Star	
Waldemar F.A. Wendt	1933	Admiral; destroyer commander; commander-in-chief of the United States Naval Forces Europe; recipient of three Distinguished Service Medals	
Bernard A. Clarey	1934	Admiral; submarine commander; commander of the United States Second Fleet; recipient of three Navy Crosses, five Distinguished Service Medals, and the Silver Star	
Eli Thomas Reich	1935	Vice admiral; as a lieutenant commander and commanding officer of USS Sealion, sank the Japanese battleship Kongō, the only Japanese battleship sunk by a submarine during World War II	
Louis Robertshaw	1936	Lieutenant general, Marine Corps; Marine aviator; recipient of three Distinguished Flying Crosses; World War II, Korean War, Vietnam War	
William F. Bringle	1937	Admiral; aircraft carrier and supercarrier commander; commander of the United States Seventh Fleet; recipient of the Navy Cross	
Harry Brinkley Bass	1938	Lieutenant commander; naval aviator; recipient of two Navy Crosses; USS Brinkley Bass named in his honor	
Carl Ferdinand Pfeifer	1939	Captain; destroyer commander; aide to Harry S. Truman and Dwight D. Eisenhower; recipient of the Silver Star and Legion of Merit	
Wilfred Holmes	1922	Captain; submarine commander; in May 1942 devised the ruse that revealed that "AF" was Midway Island, which led to the Japanese defeat at the Battle of Midway	
Carl Henry Jones	1914	Admiral; battleship commander; commanded the USS Maryland as commodore throughout 1943 and was named sub-area commander of the South Pacific after participating in the Battle of Tarawa	

=== Korean War combatants ===
Name	Class year	Notability	References
Field Harris	1917	Lieutenant general, USMC; commanded the 1st Marine Aircraft Wing during the Korean War	
William Frederick Harris	1939	Lieutenant colonel, USMC; commanding officer of 3rd Battalion, 7th Marines; presumed to have been killed in action on December 7, 1950, during the breakout in the Battle of Chosin Reservoir; son of Field Harris; posthumously awarded the Navy Cross	

=== Vietnam War combatants ===
Name	Class year	Notability	References
Spence M. Armstrong	1956	Lieutenant general; F-105 pilot; vice commander of Air Force Systems Command and Military Airlift Command; senior advisor to the NASA administrator	
John S. McCain Jr.	1931	Admiral; submarine commander during World War II; commander-in-chief of the United States Pacific Command (1968–1972) during the Vietnam War while his son John S. McCain III was being held in North Vietnam as a prisoner of war; both are academy graduates, as well as John S. McCain Sr. and John S. McCain IV	
Frederick H. Michaelis	1940	Admiral; naval aviator; fleet oiler and aircraft carrier commander; recipient of the Navy Cross	
Don Whitmire	1946	Rear admiral; troopship and submarine commander	
Jeremiah Denton	1947	Rear admiral; naval aviator and Navy Cross recipient who spent almost eight years as a prisoner of war in North Vietnam; United States senator from Alabama (1981–1987)	
Stanley Thomas Counts	1949	Rear admiral; commanding officer of USS Towers and USS Chicago in the Gulf of Tonkin; recipient of three Legions of Merit	
William P. Lawrence	1951	Vice admiral; naval aviator who was a prisoner of war for six years; father of Wendy B. Lawrence, 1981 Academy graduate and Navy astronaut; superintendent of the Academy (1978–1981)	
John Heaphy Fellowes	1956	Captain; A-6 Intruder pilot; prisoner of war for 6.5 years; Silver Star recipient	
Robert H. Shumaker	1956	Rear admiral; naval aviator; prisoner of war for 8 years; Distinguished Service Medal recipient; initiated use of the tap code, a common system of communication with POWs, coined the term "Hanoi Hilton" for the notorious Hỏa Lò Prison	
John McCain	1958	Captain; Vietnam-era naval aviator and POW; U.S. senator from Arizona (1987–2018); Republican presidential nominee 2008	
John Ripley	1962	Colonel, Marine Corps; recipient of the Navy Cross for stopping a column of tanks and 20,000 enemy troops at the Dong Ha Bridge, Quảng Trị Province, South Vietnam	
David S. Bill III	1966	Rear admiral; destroyer, cruiser and battleship commander; recipient of two Legions of Merit; grandson of U.S. Representative Winder R. Harris	

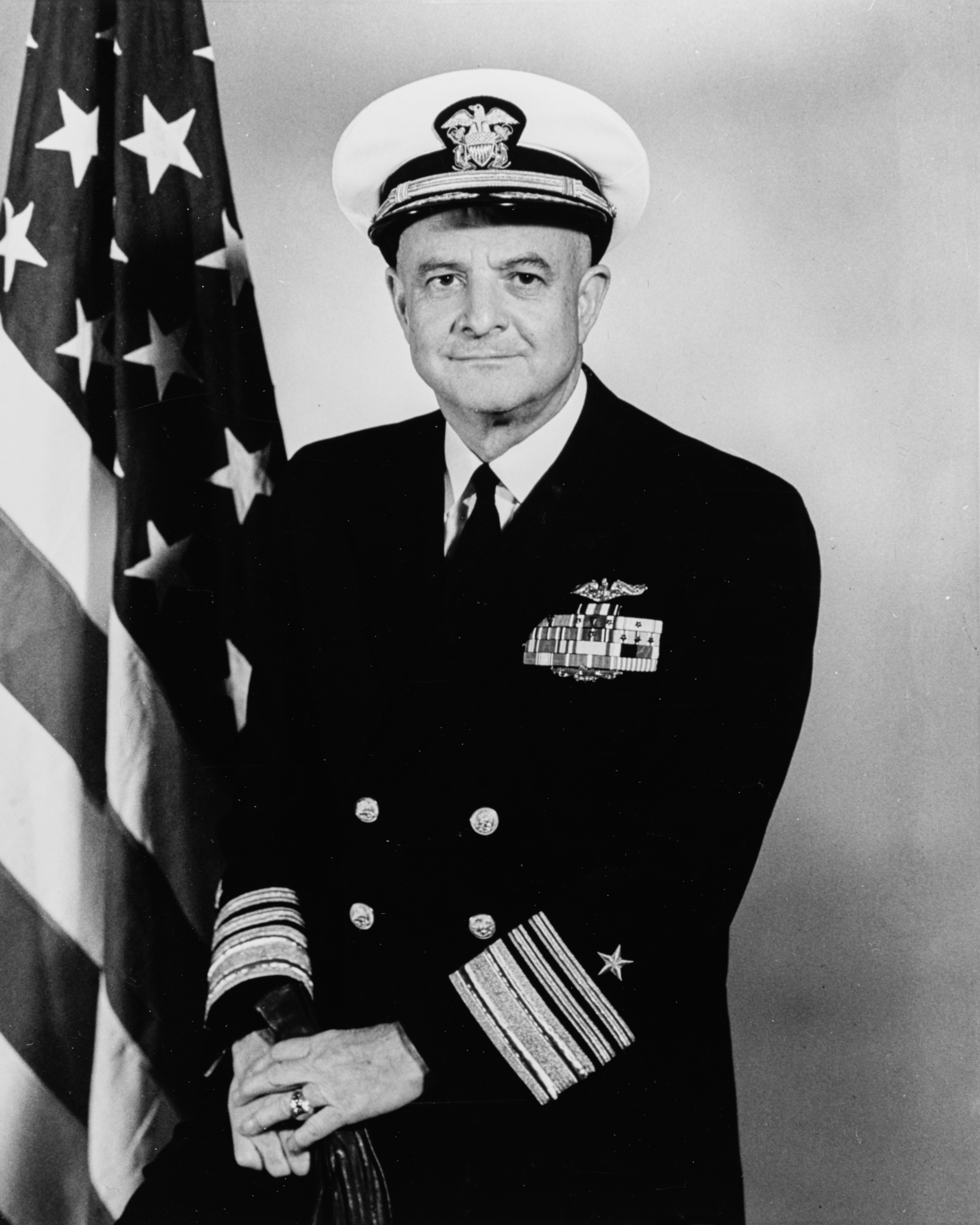
John McCain Jr.

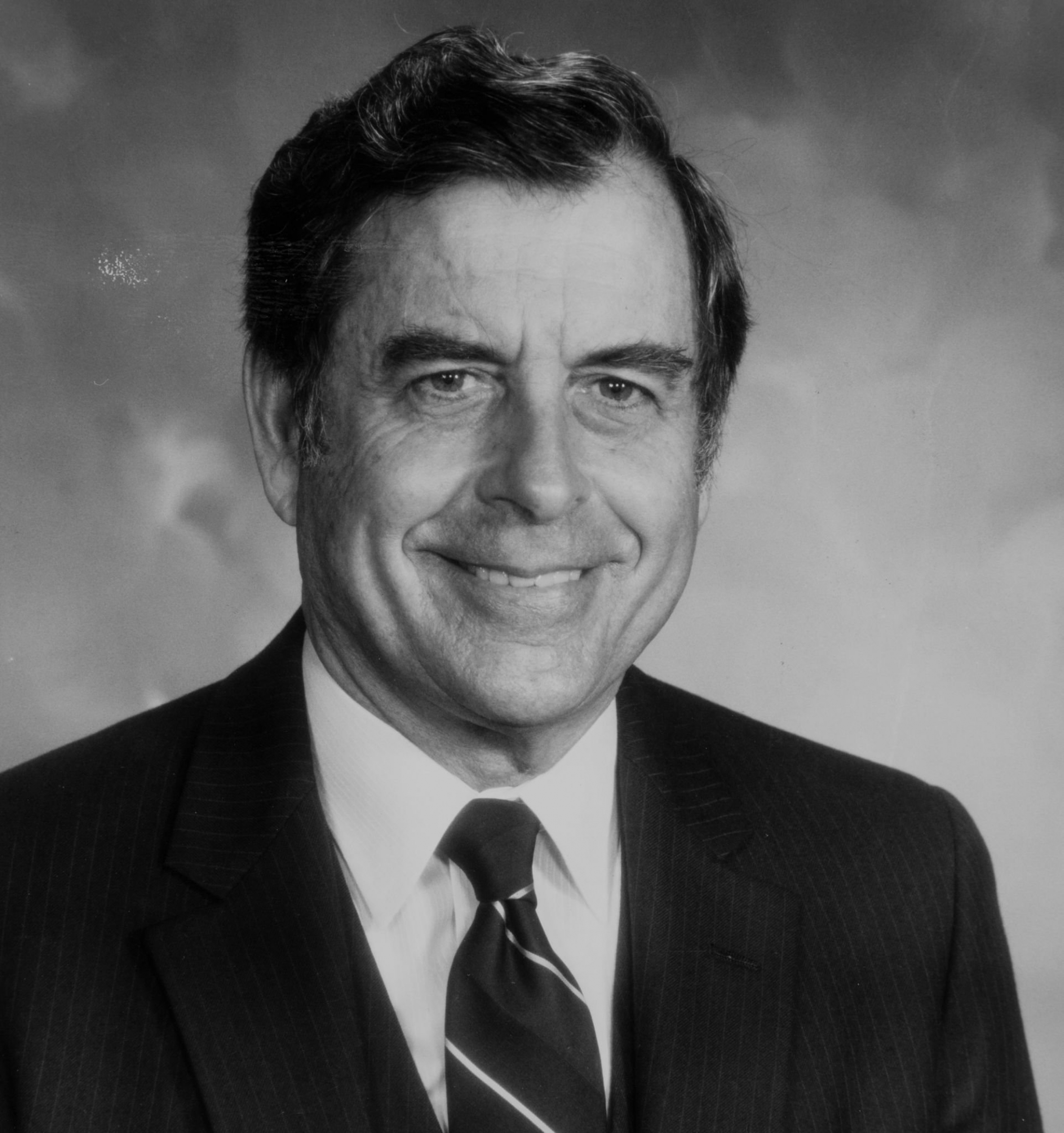
Jeremiah Denton

=== Combatants of wars in Iraq and Afghanistan ===
Name	Class year	Notability	References
John R. Allen	1976	Commander of the International Security Assistance Force and U.S. Forces Afghanistan (USFOR-A) July 2011–2013	
Dirk J. Debbink	1977	Vice admiral; chief of Navy Reserve; recipient of the Defense Superior Service Medal and the Legion of Merit	
Kevin M. Quinn	1977	Rear admiral; destroyer commander; Task Force 73/Commander, Logistics Group Western Pacific; commander of Carrier Strike Group Three; commander, Naval Surface Force Atlantic; recipient of the Navy Distinguished Service Medal and the Legion of Merit	
Frank Craig Pandolfe	1980	Rear admiral; destroyer commander	
Andrew L. Lewis	1985	Vice admiral; naval aviator, commander of United States Second Fleet, Carrier Strike Group 12, the Naval Strike and Air Warfare Center, Carrier Air Wing Three, Strike Fighter Squadron 106, Strike Fighter Squadron 15, and USS Theodore Roosevelt	
Timothy Szymanski	1985	Deputy commanding general sustainment to Special Operations Joint Task Force-Afghanistan/NATO Special Operations Component Command-Afghanistan	
Jeffrey Trail	1991	Navy ensign who served in the Gulf War; received the badge of lieutenant (junior grade) in May 1993	
Erik S. Kristensen	1995	Lieutenant commander in the United States Navy SEALs; killed in action trying to rescue fellow SEALs in Operation Red Wings during the war in Afghanistan	
Douglas A. Zembiec	1995	Major, Marine Corps; serving his fourth tour in Iraq when he was killed in action during Operation Iraqi Freedom; known as the "Lion of Fallujah" for actions during the First Battle of Fallujah	

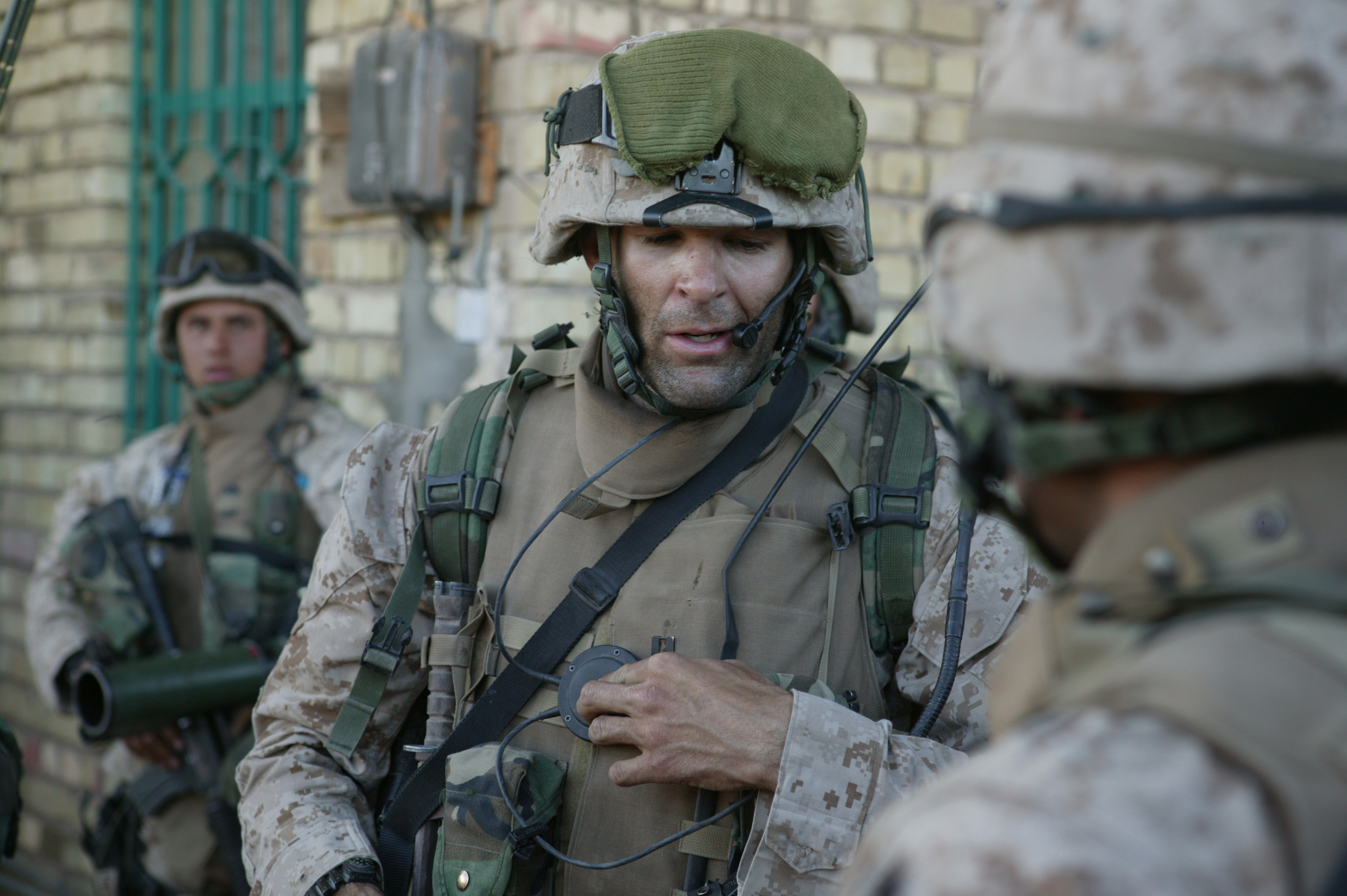
Douglas Zembiec

== Scientists ==
Name	Class year	Notability	References
Albert Abraham Michelson	1873	Physicist who received the 1907 Nobel Prize in Physics, the first American to receive the Nobel Prize in sciences; noted for his work on the measurement of the speed of light, especially for the Michelson–Morley experiment	
Frank Julian Sprague	1878	Often called the inventor of public transportation; made developments in electric traction and enormous contributions in the areas of control and safety, without which mass transit would not be possible	
John Bernadou	1880	Chemist who invented the nitrocellulose propellent used by the United States Army and Navy through both world wars, receiving a patent for it in 1897	
Oliver Shallenberger	1881	Electrical engineer who invented the induction meter for measuring alternating current, receiving a patent for it in 1888	
Alfred Wilkinson Johnson	1899	Vice admiral; as commander, Atlantic Squadron, winter 1938–1939, collaborated with the Naval Research Laboratory in conducting the first comprehensive radar experiments at sea, resulting in development of radar for fire-control systems	
Richard E. Byrd	1912	Rear admiral; Arctic and Antarctic explorer; Medal of Honor recipient for aerial and Arctic explorations; assistant to officer in charge, Navy Recruiting Bureau	
Hyman G. Rickover	1922	Submariner and engineering duty officer; "father of the nuclear navy" as director of the Naval Reactors Branch in the Bureau of Ships (1949–1982); 64 years of active service	
Joseph Weber	1940	Physicist; a developer of the maser, laser, and a pioneer of gravitational wave detection; the Joseph Weber Award for Astronomical Instrumentation was named in his honor; his first gravitational radiation antenna was displayed at the Smithsonian Institution	
William Wohlsen Behrens Jr.	1944	Vice admiral; oceanographer of the Navy who helped establish the National Oceanic and Atmospheric Administration	
Don Walsh	1954	Oceanographer, explorer and marine policy specialist; made a record-breaking descent into the Mariana Trench, the deepest point in the world's oceans, in 1960 along with Jacques Piccard aboard the bathyscaphe Trieste	
Alan Hale	1980	Astronomer and discoverer of Comet Hale–Bopp in 1995	

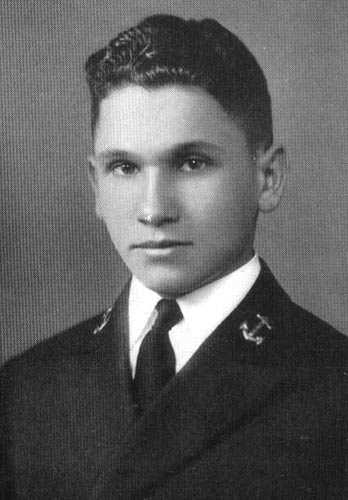
Joseph Weber

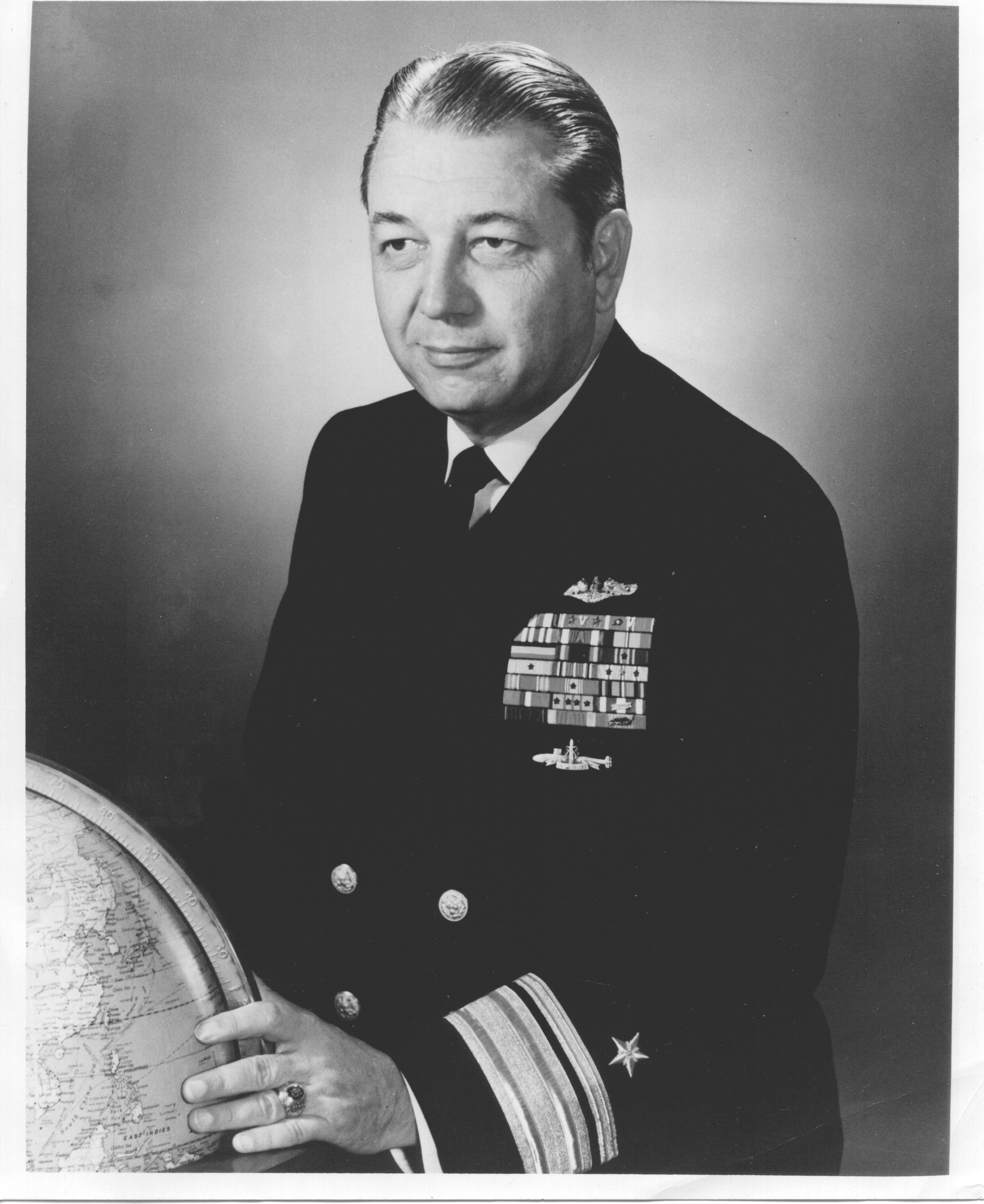
W. W. Behrens Jr.

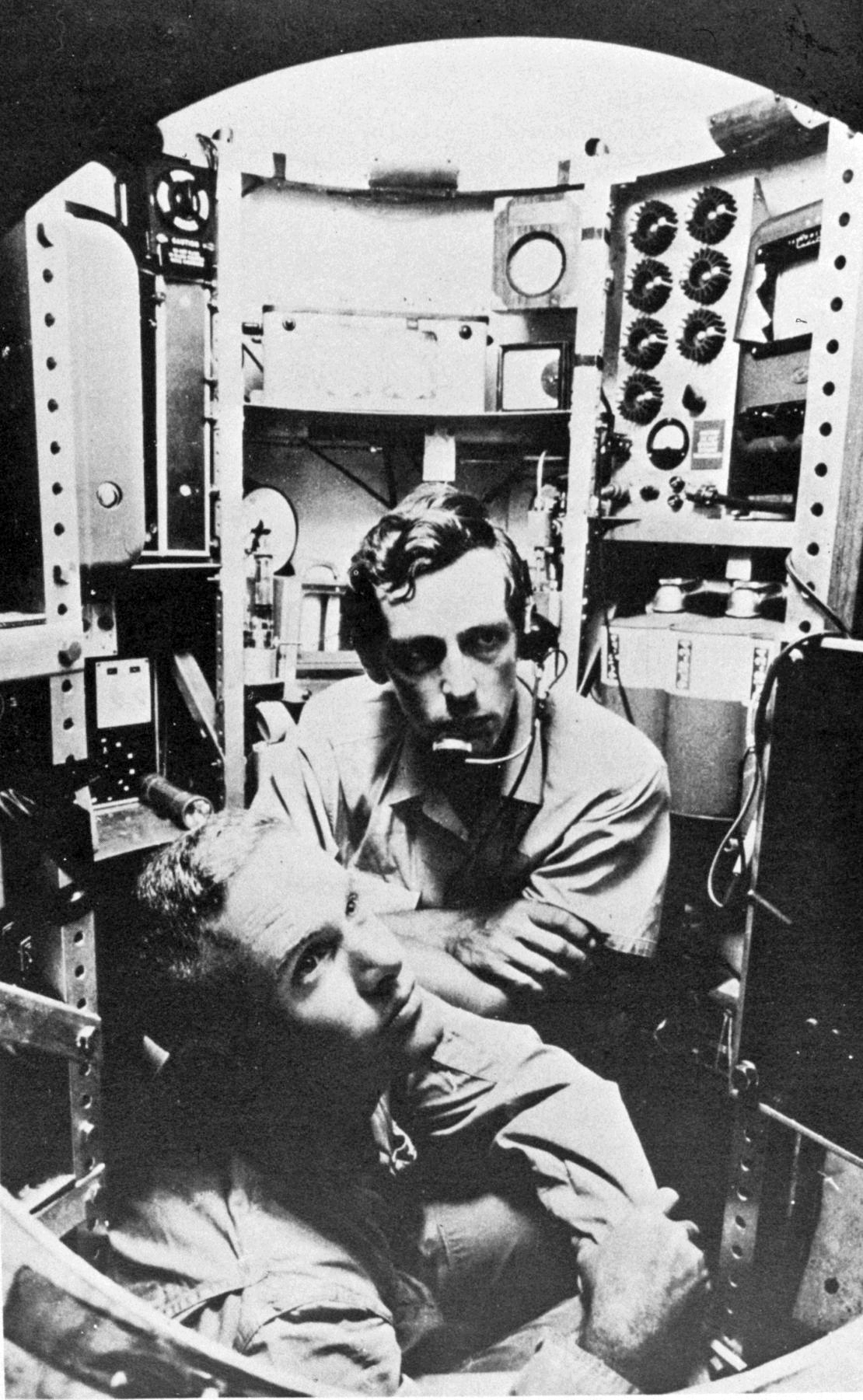
Walsh (rear) on board the Trieste

== Television figures ==
Name	Class year	Notability	References
Ellis M. Zacharias	1912	Narrator of the NBC Cold War docudrama Behind Closed Doors (1958–1959)	
Oliver North	1968	Vietnam veteran; White House aide; author; host of Fox News' War Stories with Oliver North; and a radio host	
Montel Williams	1980	Actor and host of The Montel Williams Show	

== Notable fictional alumni ==
Name	Class year	Notability	References
Steve McGarrett	Probably 1941 or 1942	Hawaii state officer played by Jack Lord in the original version of the TV series Hawaii Five-O; he had a Naval Academy diploma prominently displayed on the wall of his office in the series.	
Thomas Magnum	1967 or 1968, depending on the episode	Private investigator Thomas Sullivan Magnum IV played by Tom Selleck in the TV series Magnum P.I.; played quarterback on the Naval Academy football team and served as a SEAL in Vietnam.	
Jack Ryan	Probably 1972	CIA analyst and former Marine officer John Patrick "Jack" Ryan Sr. played by Alec Baldwin in the film version of The Hunt for Red October. (in the Tom Clancy novels, he was a Boston College NROTC graduate). In Patriot Games he is a history professor at the Naval Academy.	
A. J. Chegwidden	Probably 1966 or 1967	Rear Admiral Upper Half Albert Jethro 'A.J.' Chegwidden JAGC, USN (Retired), former Judge Advocate General of the U.S. Navy, as played by John M. Jackson in the TV series JAG. He started his Navy career as a SEAL in Vietnam, switched to surface warfare and rose to command an Arleigh Burke class destroyer, then switched to the JAG Corps after attending law school in the 1980s.	
Raymond Reddington	Probably 1984	Reformed criminal Raymond "Red" Reddington, as played by James Spader, works with the FBI on the TV series The Blacklist. He graduated first in his class from the Naval Academy and worked in counterintelligence. He then became a criminal, eventually reaching number 4 on the FBI's Most Wanted List.	
Peter Ulysses "Sturgis" Turner	Presumably 1985	Commander and Judge Advocate in the U.S. Navy, as played by Scott Lawrence in the TV series JAG. He was classmates with Harmon Rabb.	
Harmon Rabb	1985	Captain and Judge Advocate in the U.S. Navy, as played by David James Elliott in the TV series JAG. Former F-14 Tomcat pilot. He was classmates with Sturgis Turner at Annapolis.	
Steve McGarrett	1997 or 1998	Hawaii state police officer played by Alex O'Loughlin in the 2010 revival of the TV series Hawaii Five-0; he is constantly identified as LCDR McGarrett, his rank in the Naval Reserves. He graduated first in his class from the Naval Academy, first in BUD/S class 203, and served for six years as a SEAL prior to transferring to Naval Intelligence.	

== Faculty ==
These faculty are not graduates, consequently their class year is listed as "NA" for 'not applicable' and they are listed alphabetically by last name.

Name	Class year	Notability	References
Matthew Fontaine Maury	NA	Pathfinder of the Seas joined the United States Navy as a midshipman aboard the frigate Brandywine in 1825; became the US Naval Observatory's first superintendent in 1844, and later joined the Confederate States Navy where he was instrumental in the development of naval mines and submarines; several ships have been named in his honor	
James H. Ward	NA	When the new Naval School opened at Annapolis on October 10, 1845, Lt. Ward was a member of the faculty—one of the first line officers to pass along the benefits of his own experience to young midshipmen; USS Ward and Ward Hall were named for him	
Glenn Warner	NA	Head coach of the Academy's men's soccer team 1942–1975; led the team to a national title in 1964	

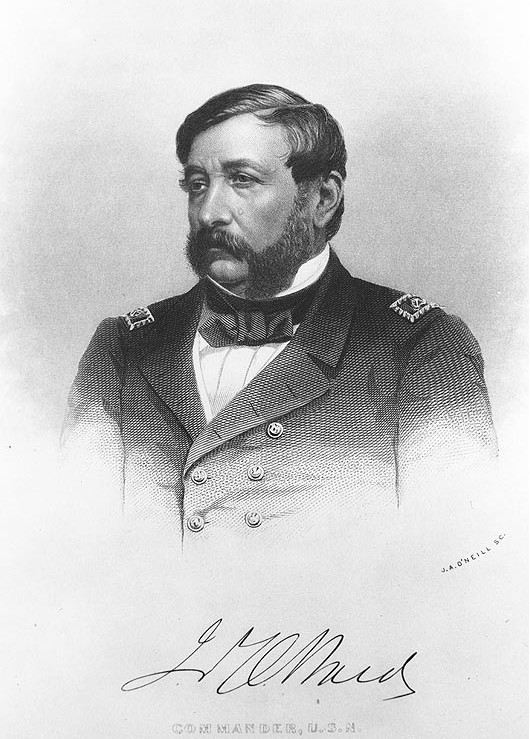
James H. Ward

== Distinguished International Alumni ==
Name	Class year	Notability	References
Enrique Jurado	1934	First commanding officer of the offshore patrol of the Philippine Army, which distinguished itself during the onset of World War II in the Philippines; Philippine flag bearer and entry in bantamweight boxing in the 1936 Olympics.	
Roberto Lim	1942	World War II veteran; only Filipino B-29 Superfortress captain; reorganizer of the Philippine Army Air Corps after World War II, which became the Philippine Air Force a year later; Philippine Airlines executive	
Roilo Golez	1970	Filipino politicians who served 6 terms as the 2nd District Representative of Parañaque City in the House of Representative of the Philippines 1992–2013; appointed as National Security Adviser by Pres. Gloria Macapagal Arroyo 2001–2003	

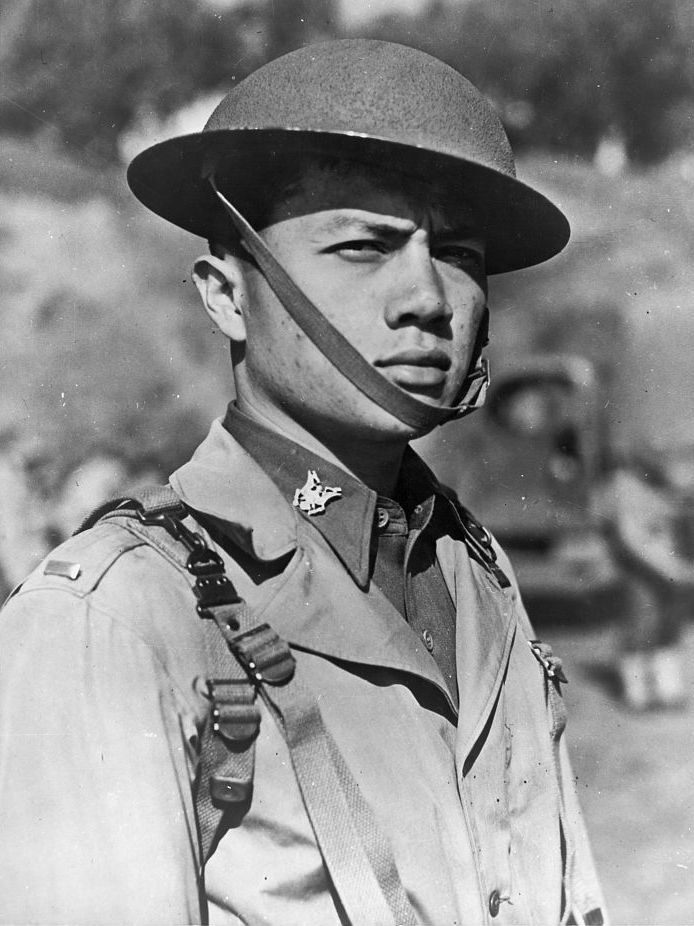
Lt. Roberto H. Lim

== See also ==
- Shipmate (magazine)
- Hispanics in the United States Naval Academy
- USNA Out
- United States Service Academies Class of 1980 - first class to graduate with female cadets
