= Political party strength in American Samoa =

The following table indicates the party of elected officials in the United States insular area of American Samoa:

- Governor
- Lieutenant Governor

The table also indicates the historical party composition in the:

- Territorial Senate
- Territorial House of Representatives
- Territory delegation to the U.S. House of Representatives

For a particular year, the noted partisan composition is that which either took office during that year or which maintained the office throughout the year. Only changes made outside regularly scheduled elections are noted as affecting the partisan composition during a particular year. Shading is determined by the final result of any mid-cycle changes in partisan affiliation.

Year	Executive offices		Territorial Legislature		Delegate
Year	Governor	Lieutenant Governor	Senate	House	Delegate
1900	Benjamin Franklin Tilley (Note: Commandant.)	no such office	no such bodies		no such office
1901	Uriel Sebree	no such office	no such bodies		no such office
1902	Henry Minett (Note: Acting commandant.)	no such office	no such bodies		no such office
1903–1904	Edmund Beardsley Underwood (Note: Commandant/governor; from 1904 to 1980, governors were appointed by the United States government.)	no such office	no such bodies		no such office
1905–1907	Charles Brainard Taylor Moore	no such office	no such bodies		no such office
1908–1909	John Frederick Parker	no such office	no such bodies		no such office
1910–1912	William Michael Crose (Note: 17 July 1911: U.S. Naval Station Tutuila renamed American Samoa.)	no such office	no such bodies		no such office
1913	Nathan Post (Note: Acting governor.)	no such office	no such bodies		no such office
1913	Clark Daniel Stearns	no such office	no such bodies		no such office
1914	Nathan Post	no such office	no such bodies		no such office
1915	Charles Armijo Woodruff	no such office	no such bodies		no such office
1916–1918	John Martin Poyer	no such office	no such bodies		no such office
1919	Warren Terhune	no such office	no such bodies		no such office
1920–1921	Waldo A. Evans	no such office	no such bodies		no such office
1922	E. T. Pollock	no such office	no such bodies		no such office
1923–1924	Edward Stanley Kellogg	no such office	no such bodies		no such office
1925–1926	Henry Francis Bryan	no such office	no such bodies		no such office
1927–1928	Stephen Victor Graham (Note: On February 20, 1929, the U.S. Congress recognized of the cession of Tutuila and Manu'a by their chiefs, retroactive to 16 July 1904.)	no such office	no such bodies		no such office
1929–1930	Gatewood Lincoln	no such office	no such bodies		no such office
1931	James Sutherland Spore	no such office	no such bodies		no such office
1931	Arthur Emerson	no such office	no such bodies		no such office
1932	Gatewood Lincoln	no such office	no such bodies		no such office
1933	George Landenberger	no such office	no such bodies		no such office
1934	Thomas C. Latimore	no such office	no such bodies		no such office
1935	Otto Dowling	no such office	no such bodies		no such office
1936	Thomas Benjamin Fitzpatrick	no such office	no such bodies		no such office
1937	MacGillivray Milne	no such office	no such bodies		no such office
1938–1939	Edward Hanson	no such office	no such bodies		no such office
1940	Jesse Wallace	no such office	no such bodies		no such office
1941	Laurence Wild	no such office	no such bodies		no such office
1942	Henry Louis Larsen (Note: Military governor.)	no such office	no such bodies		no such office
1943	John Gould Moyer	no such office	no such bodies		no such office
1944	Allen Hobbs	no such office	no such bodies		no such office
1945	Ralph Hungerford	no such office	no such bodies		no such office
1945	Samuel Canan	no such office	no such bodies		no such office
1946	Harold Houser	no such office	no such bodies		no such office
1947	Vernon Huber	no such office	no such bodies		no such office
1948	Vernon Huber	no such office	18 NP	21 NP	no such office
1949–1950	Thomas Darden	no such office	18 NP	21 NP	no such office
1951	Phelps Phelps (R)	no such office	18 NP	21 NP	no such office
1952	John C. Elliott (D)	no such office	18 NP	21 NP	no such office
1952	James Arthur Ewing (D)	no such office	18 NP	21 NP	no such office
1953	Lawrence M. Judd (R)	no such office	18 NP	21 NP	no such office
1954–1955	Richard Barrett Lowe (R)	no such office	18 NP	21 NP	no such office
1956–1960	Peter Tali Coleman (R)	no such office	18 NP	21 NP	no such office
1961–1966	H. Rex Lee (D)	no such office	18 NP	21 NP	no such office
1967–1968	Owen Aspinall (D)	no such office	18 NP	21 NP	no such office
1969–1973	John Morse Haydon (R)	no such office	18 NP	21 NP	no such office
1974	Frank Mockler (R)	no such office	18 NP	21 NP	no such office
1975	Earl B. Ruth (R)	no such office	18 NP	21 NP	no such office
1976	Frank Barnett (R)	no such office	18 NP	21 NP	no such office
1977	H. Rex Lee (D)	no such office	18 NP	21 NP	no such office
1978–1980	Peter Tali Coleman (R) (Note: Beginning in 1980, governors have been elected for 4-year terms by the people of American Samoa.)	Tufele Liamatua (R)	18 NP	21 NP	no such office
1981–1984	Peter Tali Coleman (R)	Tufele Liamatua (R)	18 NP	21 NP	Fofō Iosefa Fiti Sunia (D)
1985–1988	A. P. Lutali (D)	Eni Faleomavaega (D)	18 NP	21 NP	Fofō Iosefa Fiti Sunia (D)
1989–1992	Peter Tali Coleman (R)	Galea'i Peni Poumele (R)	18 NP	21 NP	Eni Faleomavaega (D)
1993–1996	A. P. Lutali (D)	Tauese Sunia (D)	18 NP	21 NP	Eni Faleomavaega (D)
1997–2002	Tauese Sunia (D)	Togiola Tulafono (D)	18 NP	21 NP	Eni Faleomavaega (D)
2003–2012	Togiola Tulafono (D)	Faoa Aitofele Sunia (D)	18 NP	21 NP	Eni Faleomavaega (D)
2013–2014	Lolo Matalasi Moliga (I)	Lemanu Peleti Mauga (D)	18 NP	21 NP	Eni Faleomavaega (D)
2015	Lolo Matalasi Moliga (I)	Lemanu Peleti Mauga (D)	18 NP	21 NP	Amata Coleman; Radewagen (R)
2016–2020	Lolo Matalasi Moliga (D)	Lemanu Peleti Mauga (D)	18 NP	21 NP	Amata Coleman; Radewagen (R)
2021–2024	Lemanu Peleti Mauga (D)	Eleasalo Ale (D)	18 NP	21 NP	Amata Coleman; Radewagen (R)
2025–2027	Pula Nikolao Pula (R)	Pulu Ae Ae Jr. (R)	18 NP	21 NP	Amata Coleman; Radewagen (R)

Key to party colors and abbreviations for members of the U.S. Congress and other politicians or officials
Alaskan Independence (AKIP) Know Nothing (KN) American Labor (AL) Anti-Jacksonian (Anti-J); National Republican (NR) Anti-Administration (AA) Anti-Masonic (Anti-M) Conservative (Con) Covenant (Cov)	Democratic (D) Democratic–Farmer–Labor (DFL) Democratic–NPL (D-NPL) Dixiecrat (Dix), States' Rights (SR) Democratic-Republican (DR) Farmer–Labor (FL) Federalist (F); Pro-Administration (PA)	Free Soil (FS) Fusion (Fus) Greenback (GB) Independence (IPM) Jacksonian (J) Liberal (Lib) Libertarian (L) National Union (NU)	Nonpartisan League (NPL) Nullifier (N) Opposition Northern (O); Opposition Southern (O) Populist (Pop) Progressive (Prog) Prohibition (Proh) Readjuster (Rea)	Republican (R) Silver (Sv) Silver Republican (SvR) Socialist (Soc) Union (U) Unconditional Union (UU) Vermont Progressive (VP) Whig (W)	Independent (I) Nonpartisan (NP)

== See also ==
- Politics of American Samoa
- Elections in American Samoa
