= Governor Emerson =

Governor Emerson may refer to:

- Arthur Emerson (1893–1975), governor of American Samoa
- Frank Emerson (1882–1931), 15th Governor of Wyoming
- Lee E. Emerson (1898–1976), 69th Governor of Vermont

== See also ==
- Louis Lincoln Emmerson (1863–1941), 27th Governor of Illinois
