= Governor Lincoln =

Governor Lincoln may refer to:

- Enoch Lincoln (1788–1829), Governor of Maine
- Levi Lincoln Sr. (1749–1820), Governor of Massachusetts
- Levi Lincoln Jr. (1782–1868), Governor of Massachusetts
- Gatewood Lincoln (1875–1957), Naval Governor of American Samoa

== See also ==
- Lincoln Chafee (born 1953), Governor of Rhode Island
- Lincoln Almond (born 1936), Governor of Rhode Island
