= George Landenberger =

United States Navy officer and governor of American Samoa (1879–1936)

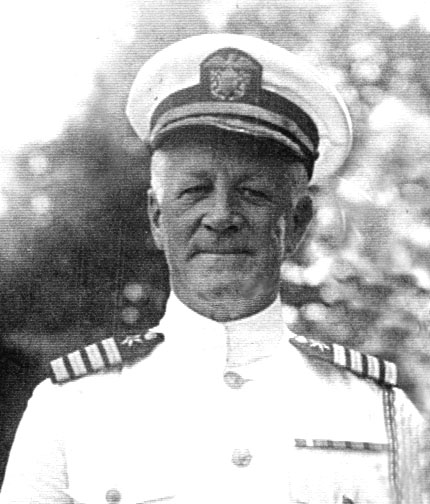
- Landenberger as governor in 1932

Governor of American Samoa
- In office May 12, 1932 – April 10, 1934
- Preceded by: Gatewood Lincoln
- Succeeded by: Thomas Latimore

Personal details
- Born: George Bertram Landenberger; May 12, 1879 Philadelphia, Pennsylvania
- Died: 15 January 1936 (aged 56) Philadelphia, Pennsylvania
- Education: United States Naval Academy
- Occupation: Naval officer
- Awards: Navy Cross

Military service
- Allegiance: United States
- Branch/service: United States Navy
- Rank: Captain
- Commands: USS Indiana; USS Pennsylvania; USS Arkansas; 15th Naval District; Philadelphia Naval Shipyard; Destroyer squad of the Asiatic Fleet

George Bertram Landenberger (May 12, 1879 – January 15, 1936) was a United States Navy Captain and the governor of American Samoa, from May 12, 1932, to April 10, 1934. Landenberger commanded many ships during his naval career, as well as two naval yards. He received the Navy Cross for his actions commanding USS Indiana during World War I. He died of cancer in 1936, one year after retiring from military service.

== Life ==
=== Early life ===
Landenberger was born in Philadelphia, Pennsylvania, on May 12, 1879.

=== Naval career ===
Landenberger attended the United States Naval Academy from Germantown, Philadelphia, Pennsylvania, on May 10, 1896, graduating in 1900. As an ensign, he joined the United States Asiatic Fleet, eventually joining forces in the Philippines. Landenberger served on USS Alabama during 1906. In 1915, he served as a lieutenant commander on USS Louisiana.

Landenberger received the Navy Cross for his service as commanding officer of USS Indiana during the First World War. The citation read: "The Navy Cross is awarded to Captain George Landenberger, U.S. Navy, for exceptionally meritorious service in a duty of great responsibility as commanding officer of the U.S.S. Indiana, in the Atlantic Fleet." After Indiana, Landenberger commanded two other ships, USS Pennsylvania in 1930 and USS Arkansas in 1932, as well as the entire destroyer squadron of the Asiatic Fleet from 1924 to 1926.

Right before becoming the governor of American Samoa, Landenberger was in the post of Chief of Staff of the 15th Naval District in the Panama Canal Zone. This followed an appointment to the command of the Naval Station on Goat Island. After serving as governor, he was reassigned as head of the Philadelphia Naval Shipyard.

=== Later life ===
Landenberger retired from service in 1935 to Haverford, Pennsylvania. December 10 of that year, Landenberger underwent treatment for lung problems, receiving several blood transfusions. He died on January 15, 1936, of sarcoma of the chest. He died at the Naval Hospital in Philadelphia.

== Governorship ==
Landenberger became Governor of American Samoa on May 12, 1932, succeeding Gatewood Lincoln. He served until April 10, 1934.

As Governor, Landenberger enhanced the annual American Samoa Fono sessions by hosting delegates and community leaders for lunches at the Government House. He declared that only urgent matters should be directed to him, with all other issues to be resolved by the Fono. In response, High Orator Tuiasosopo Mariota and the Eastern District passed a resolution in the following Fono stating that "no new laws should be made or changed unless first decided in the Fono." While Governor Landenberger denied this resolution, he wrote to the U.S. Navy in Washington, D.C., highlighting the significant attachment the American Samoan people felt towards their Fono. Landenberger initiated a review of land ownership and matai laws, proposing that part-Samoans who had lived in the islands for five years and adopted the Samoan way of life be entitled to hold matai titles. Despite strong opposition, this led to a change in the blood requirement for holding matai titles, reducing it from 100% to 75%.

In 1932, Governor Landenberger established the territory’s first Department of Agriculture to expand and improve agricultural production. An experimental farm was set up at Taputimu, but limited engagement from local farmers meant the project produced few results.
