= Ralph Hungerford =

American Naval officer (1896 - 1977)

Ralph Waldo Hungerford
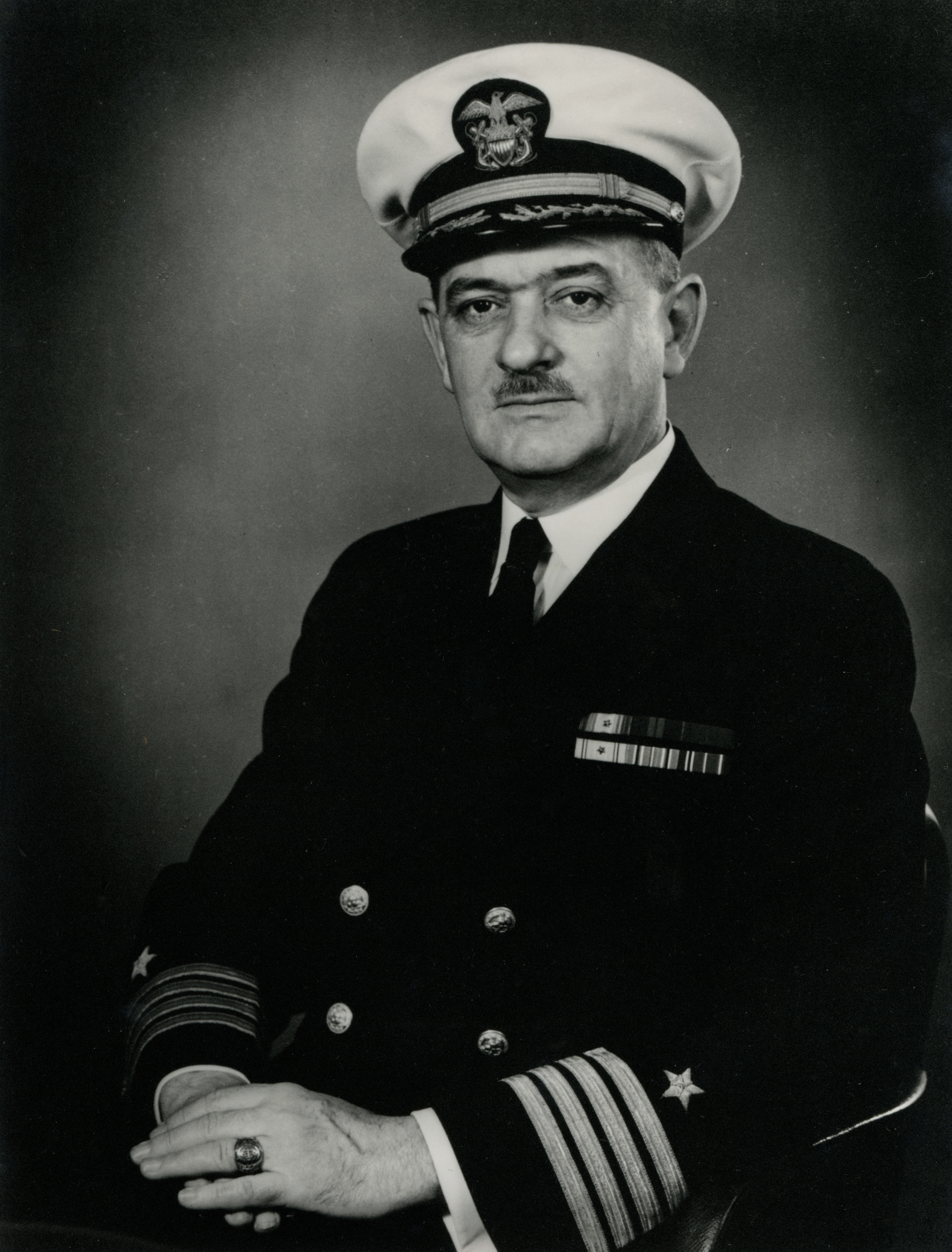

Governor of American Samoa
- In office January 27, 1945 – September 3, 1945
- Preceded by: Allen Hobbs
- Succeeded by: Samuel Canan

Personal details
- Born: April 21, 1896 Windsor, New York
- Died: 22 February 1977 (aged 79) Abington, Pennsylvania
- Education: United States Naval Academy
- Occupation: Naval officer
- Awards: Legion of Merit

Military service
- Allegiance: United States
- Branch/service: United States Navy
- Rank: Captain
- Commands: Commander, Anti-submarine warfare - Atlantic Ocean
- Battles/wars: World War II

Ralph Waldo Hungerford (April 21, 1896 – February 20, 1977) was a United States Navy captain, and the governor of American Samoa from January 27, 1945, to September 3, 1945. He was born April 21, 1896, in Windsor, New York, but moved to Rhode Island later in life. He received appointment to the United States Naval Academy on June 17, 1915. During World War II, he served on the staff of Rear Admiral Adolphus Andrews in defense of the East Coast of the United States; he specialized in antisubmarine warfare. He was awarded the Legion of Merit on January 14, 1943. Hungerford became governor on January 27, 1945, and faced the daunting task of restoring the island to a pre-Pacific War economy. He died in 1977 in Pennsylvania.

== Life ==
Hungerford was born April 21, 1896, in Windsor, New York. At the time of his appointment as governor, his legal residence was in Rhode Island. He died on February 20, 1977, in Abington, Pennsylvania.

== Naval career ==
Hungerford was admitted to the United States Naval Academy on June 17, 1915, from Pennsylvania, graduating in 1919. He served on the staff of Rear admiral Adolphus Andrews, Commander, Eastern Sea Frontier, who had been entrusted with the defense of the Atlantic Coast in 1941. Hungerford was placed in charge of antisubmarine warfare.

== Governorship ==
Hungerford became Governor of American Samoa on January 27, 1945, relieving Allen Hobbs of the post and serving until September 3, 1945. (From 1905 to 1951, US Naval commanders were appointed to the position.) As governor, Hungerford successfully requested the removal of the sonobuoys from Pago Pago Harbor. His main goal during his term was to return the islands to domestic economy and routine, converting them from the vital wartime centers they had been in the Pacific War. Among his challenges were cutting unemployment, restoring the copra industry, revitalizing the fishing industry, and re-opening schools closed during World War II. He often held meetings with the native chiefs. They made requests for new roads and projects, and voiced their concerns about island affairs.
