= John Gould Moyer =

Naval officer and Governor of American Samoa

Governor of American Samoa
- In office June 5, 1942 – February 8, 1944
- Preceded by: Laurence Wild
- Succeeded by: Allen Hobbs

Personal details
- Born: July 12, 1893 Chicago, Illinois
- Died: January 21, 1976 (aged 82) Honolulu, Hawaii
- Education: United States Naval Academy
- Occupation: Naval officer

Military service
- Allegiance: United States
- Branch/service: United States Navy
- Rank: Rear admiral

John Gould Moyer (July 12, 1893 – January 21, 1976) was a United States Navy Rear admiral, and the governor of American Samoa from June 5, 1942, to February 8, 1944. He was born in Chicago, Illinois, but lived in both Indiana and Hawaii for much of his life. Moyer was admitted to the United States Naval Academy on June 16, 1910, and became an Ensign shortly upon graduation. He became a Commander in 1934, a Captain in 1939, and eventually a Rear admiral. During his governorship, Moyer recommended the tour of duty of the men under his command be reduced, and took over command of the United States Marines barracks previously under the control of Brigadier general Henry Louis Larsen.

== Life ==
Moyer was born in Chicago, Illinois. He was born to Eva Gould Moyer; his grandfather was a longtime district judge in Indiana. Moyer lived in Delphi, Indiana for much of his early life. He died in Honolulu, Hawaii at the age of 82.

== Naval career ==
Moyer was admitted to the United States Naval Academy on June 16, 1910. As an Ensign, he served on the USS South Carolina in 1917. He was promoted to the rank of Commander in 1934, and President of the United States Franklin Roosevelt recommended Moyer for the rank of Captain in 1939. He eventually became a Rear Admiral, and retired on June 30, 1949.

== Governorship ==
Moyer took the office of Governor of American Samoa on June 5, 1942. During his governorship, Moyer suggested the tour of duty for military personnel in American Samoa be reduced from 18 to 12 months, believing that "the climate is bad for most Caucasians". As the Pacific War drew westward, Moyer took control of the United States Marine barracks on the island, a command previously held by Henry Louis Larsen, a man with the short-lived position of Military Governor of Tutuila. Moyer ceded the office to Captain Allen Hobbs on February 8, 1944.
