= Allen Hobbs =

35th Hydrographer of the United States Navy
- In office August 30, 1948 – 1950s

Governor of American Samoa
- In office February 8, 1944 – January 27, 1945
- Preceded by: John Gould Moyer
- Succeeded by: Ralph Hungerford

Personal details
- Born: July 30, 1899 Lowell, Massachusetts
- Died: 23 November 1960 (aged 61) National Naval Medical Center in Bethesda, Maryland
- Occupation: Naval officer

Military service
- Allegiance: United States
- Branch/service: United States Navy
- Rank: Captain

Allen Hobbs (30 July 1899 – 23 November 1960) was a captain in the United States Navy. He was assigned as the governor of American Samoa from 8 February 1944 to 27 January 1945. In 1948, he was appointed as the Hydrographer of the Navy, serving until 1953, when he retired.

== Early life and education ==
Allen Hobbs was born on 30 July 1899 in Lowell, Massachusetts. His mother was a sculptor named Louise Allen and his father was Alexander F. Hobbs. (After divorce, his mother married Albert Henry Atkins in 1927.) Allen Hobbs's maternal grandfather was Charles Herbert Allen, a representative from Massachusetts to the Forty-ninth and Fiftieth United States Congresses, the first American civilian Governor of Puerto Rico, and the assistant secretary to the navy under President McKinley.

After studying science in college, Hobbs attended the United States Naval Academy in Annapolis, Maryland, and graduated in 1919 with the accelerated class of 1920. In 1935, he was named first engineering officer of the aircraft carrier U.S.S. Yorktown when she was commissioned. In 1942, Hobbs became the commanding officer of the U.S.S. Rixey, an evacuation transport ship that operated at that time in the South Pacific Ocean throughout the Solomons from Guadalcanal to New Zealand.

In January 1944, Allen Hobbs was appointed by President Roosevelt Governor of Samoa, a position he served until early 1945, when he returned to the country to await commissioning of the U.S.S Columbus, CA-74, a heavy cruiser to which he had been assigned as commanding officer.

On 30 August 1948, Hobbs was appointed as the 35th Hydrographer of the United States Navy, serving until early 1953.

== Later years ==
On 1 March 1953, Hobbs was placed on the Temporary Disability Retirement List. He died on 23 November 1960 at the National Naval Medical Center in Bethesda, Maryland.
