= Samuel Canan =

American Naval officer and Governor of American Samoa

Samuel Wakefield Canan

Governor of American Samoa
- In office September 3, 1945 – September 10, 1945
- Preceded by: Ralph Hungerford

Personal details
- Born: June 7, 1898 Altoona, Pennsylvania, U.S.
- Died: March 1964
- Citizenship: American
- Education: United States Naval Academy
- Occupation: Naval officer, territorial governor

Military service
- Allegiance: United States
- Branch/service: United States Navy

Samuel Wakefield Canan (June 7, 1898 – March 1964) was a United States Navy officer and governor of American Samoa. Canan was born on June 7, 1898, in Altoona, Pennsylvania. He was admitted to the United States Naval Academy on June 24, 1916, out of Pennsylvania. He succeeded Ralph Hungerford as governor in 1945, filling the position for only eight days, from September 3, 1945, to September 10, 1945.
