= Arthur Emerson =

American politician

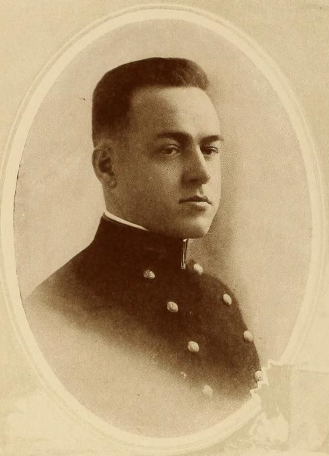
- Arthur Tenney Emerson

Governor of American Samoa
- In office April 22, 1931 – July 17, 1931
- Preceded by: James Sutherland Spore
- Succeeded by: Gatewood Lincoln

Personal details
- Born: Arthur Tenney Emerson; December 3, 1893; East Weymouth, Massachusetts, United States
- Died: 1975 (aged 81–82)
- Spouse: Gertrude Boucher Childs

Arthur Tenney Emerson (1893–1975) was the governor of American Samoa, serving from April 22 to July 17, 1931.

Emerson was born on December 3, 1893, in East Weymouth, Massachusetts, the son of Theodore and Nellie (née Newman) Emerson. He attended Dartmouth College before being appointed to the United States Naval Academy, graduating with the Class of 1916. He married Gertrude Boucher Childs, the widow of Lieutenant Earle W. F. Childs, in 1921 aboard USS Utah in Naples, Italy.

Emerson served in World War I, before receiving appointment to the governorship for a brief time.
