= Gatewood Lincoln =

Naval officer and Governor of American Samoa (1875–1957)

Gatewood Sanders Lincoln
- Lincoln in 1931.

Governor of American Samoa
- In office July 17, 1931 – May 12, 1932
- Preceded by: Arthur Emerson
- Succeeded by: George Landenberger
- In office August 2, 1929 – March 24, 1931
- Preceded by: Stephen Victor Graham
- Succeeded by: James Sutherland Spore

Personal details
- Born: August 5, 1875 Liberty, Missouri
- Died: October 15, 1957 (aged 82)
- Spouse: Enfield "Enna" Caryl Stogdale
- Education: William Jewell College; United States Naval Academy
- Occupation: Naval officer
- Awards: Navy Cross

Military service
- Allegiance: United States
- Branch/service: United States Navy
- Rank: Captain
- Commands: USS Powhatan; Department of Electrical Engineering and Physics at the United States Naval Academy
- Battles/wars: World War I, World War II

Gatewood Sanders Lincoln (August 5, 1875 – October 15, 1957) was a United States Navy officer who served as the governor of American Samoa. With Nathan Woodworth Post, Lincoln was one of only two American Samoan governors to serve non-consecutive terms. He commanded a supply ship during World War I and was an instructor at the United States Naval Academy, serving as Department Head of the College of Electrical Engineering and Physics.

Between Governor Lincoln's first and second terms, there were two acting governors.

== Biography ==
Gatewood Lincoln was born in Liberty, Missouri, to James Edwin and Margaret Lincoln, natives of Lexington, Kentucky. His father, a cousin of Abraham Lincoln, was probate judge of Clay County. Gatewood was James Lincoln's mother's maiden name. Lincoln studied at William Jewell College in Liberty, before he was appointed to the United States Naval Academy in 1892.

=== Naval career ===
Lincoln graduated from the Naval Academy in 1896, having been trained as a naval engineer. He ranked second in his class and received his first assignment by request of the captain of the USS Philadelphia. He was awarded the Navy Cross for his conduct as captain of the USS Powhatan on convoy duty during World War I.

Lincoln served on the United States Shipping Board advisory board during the 1930s and also at the Mare Island Naval Shipyard. During World War I, he saw active duty in command of a supply ship in the Atlantic. After the war, as a Commander, Lincoln was department head of Electrical Engineering and Physics at the Naval Academy. In 1943, he was called back to active duty to take command of the Naval Ammunition Depot in Fallbrook, California.

== Governorship ==
Lincoln served two terms as Governor of American Samoa, from 2 August 1929 to 24 March 1931 and from 17 July 1931 to 12 May 1932. He separated the responsibilities of the Chief Justice and the Attorney General, and he started a Samoan-led judicial commission to deal with matters involving land ownership, thereby granting the Samoan people more autonomy.

During Governor Lincoln's first term, the long-awaited Congressional commission, appointed by the President under the Bingham Bill, arrived. The congressional commission's visit from September to October 1930, and the subsequent release of its findings, led to a near halt in political unrest in the islands. Based on the commission's recommendations, a Bill of Rights was incorporated into the Codification of the Regulations and Orders for the Government.

In the 1920s, it became clear that the swift Americanization efforts were not benefiting Samoans. By 1927, the American Samoa Fono's attempt to limit educational reforms highlighted two major concerns: the disruptive effects of new knowledge and behaviors on students, and the diminishing respect for Samoan culture due to the influence of foreign teachers. This cultural disconnect led to a sense among Samoans that their children were becoming estranged from their traditional values and family ties. In response, Governor Lincoln proposed a shift in educational focus in a 1929 letter to the Board of Education, suggesting that Samoan history and customs should be taught, and that education should prioritize practical skills like agriculture over preparing students for government roles. This approach aimed to align education more closely with Samoan needs and values. This shift gained momentum in 1933 with significant changes introduced by a committee of educators from the University of Hawaiʻi, funded by the Barstow Foundation, who further adapted the curriculum to better serve local needs.

In its final years, the Mau movement in American Samoa assumed a watchdog role, diligently scrutinizing the actions of the U.S. Navy. By 1930, the movement's executive committee sought to become advisors to Governor Lincoln on all matters to ensure smooth governance. However, Governor Lincoln declined their request.
