= 2006 United States Senate election in Virginia =

- November 7, 2006
- Turnout: 44.0% (voting eligible)
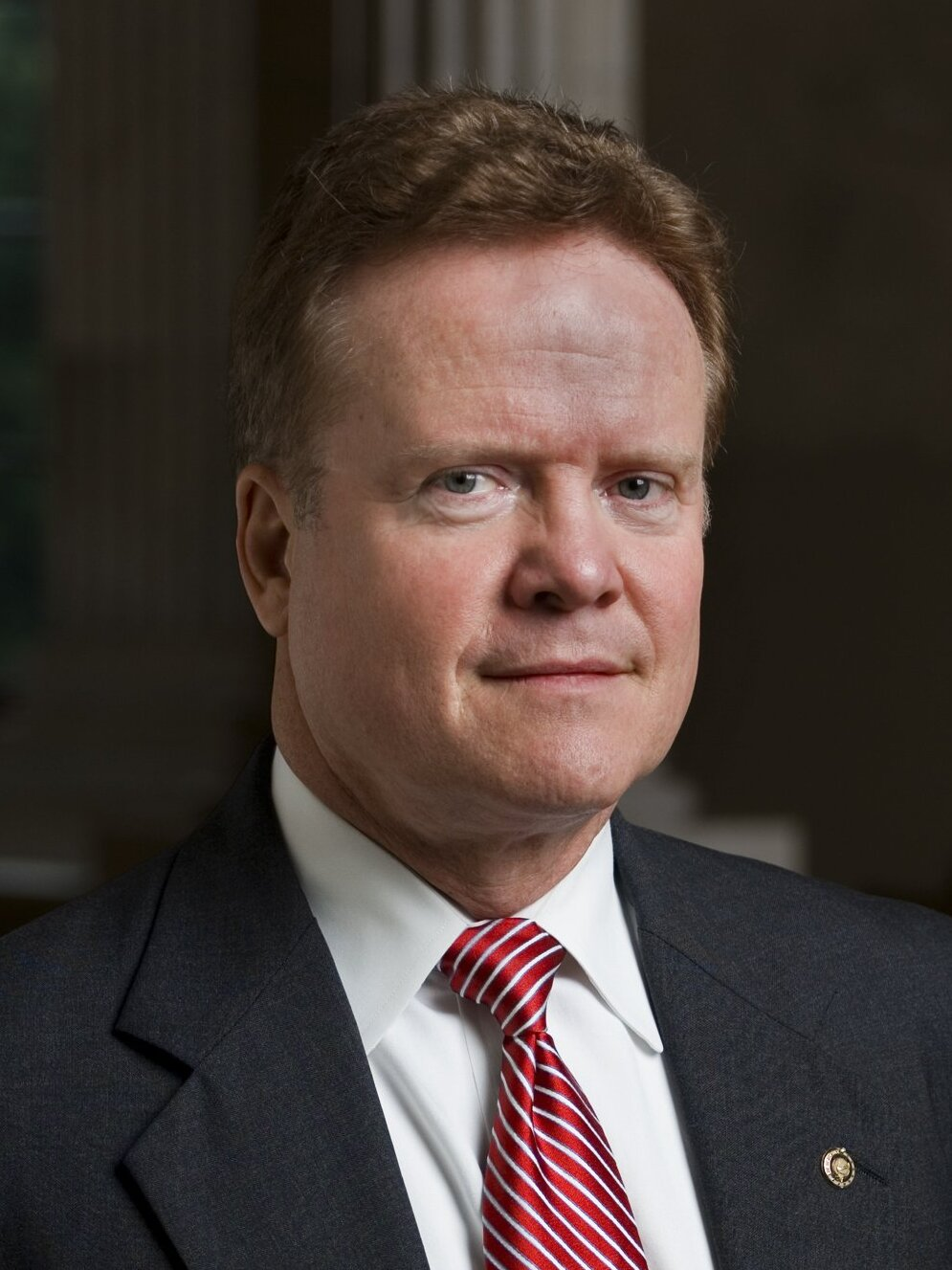

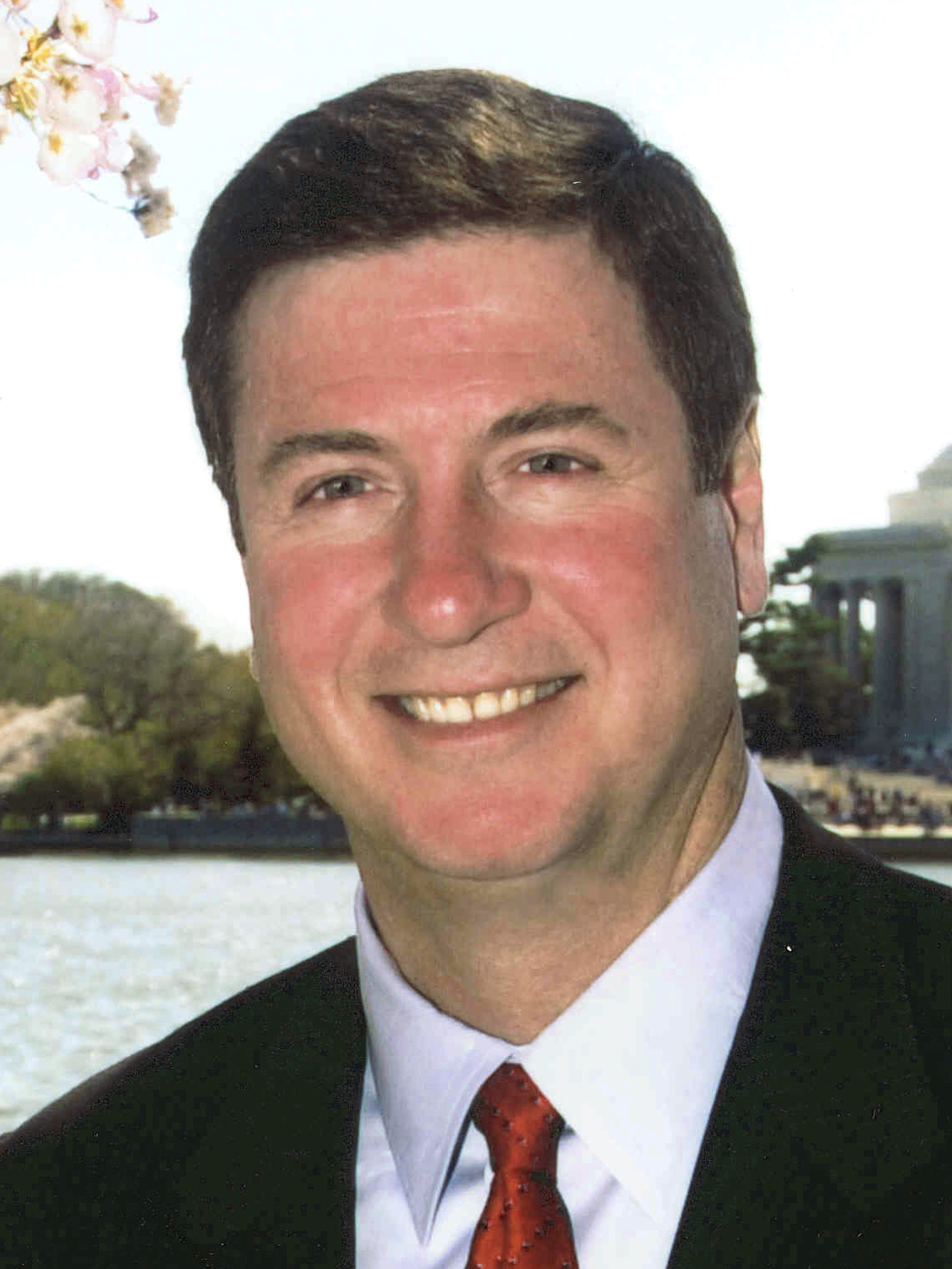
Nominee	Jim Webb	George Allen
Party	Democratic	Republican
Popular vote	1,175,606	1,166,277
Percentage	49.59%	49.20%
- Webb: 40–50% 50–60% 60–70% 70–80% Allen: 40–50% 50–60% 60–70% 70–80%
U.S. senator before election
George Allen
Republican
Elected U.S. Senator
Jim Webb
Democratic

The 2006 United States Senate election in Virginia was held November 7, 2006. Incumbent Republican Senator George Allen ran for reelection to a second term but was narrowly defeated by former Secretary of the Navy Jim Webb, who earned 49.6% of the vote to Allen's 49.2%. With a margin of just 0.4%, this election was the closest race of the 2006 Senate election cycle. This was the second consecutive election for this seat where the incumbent lost re-election. Allen later unsuccessfully ran for this seat again in 2012 when Webb did not seek re-election. This is the last time a senator from Virginia lost re-election.

== Background ==
Allen, who previously served as governor of Virginia and was considered a possible candidate for president in 2008, was running for his second term. Webb, a decorated Vietnam War veteran, writer and former secretary of the Navy under Ronald Reagan, won the Democratic nomination after being drafted by netroots activists, such as those at the blog Raising Kaine.

Polls clearly favored Allen through mid-August, but on August 11, he was filmed using the ethnic slur "Macaca" in reference to a Webb campaign volunteer, S.R. Sidarth, who is of Indian ancestry. He also told Sidarth, "Welcome to America and the real world of Virginia," despite the fact that Sidarth was born and raised in Fairfax County, and was a University of Virginia student at the time. Allen denied any prejudice in the comment, but the video was quickly spread online, and the gaffe caused his lead to shrink considerably. Still, he led in most polls until late October, when several surveys showed Webb with a lead—mostly within the margin of error. The election was not decided until nearly 48 hours after the polls closed, when Allen, behind by a margin of about 0.3%, conceded on November 9, 2006. With all of the other Senate races decided, the outcome swung control of the Senate to the Democrats.

== Democratic primary ==
=== Candidates ===
- Harris Miller, businessman
- Jim Webb, former United States secretary of the Navy

=== Endorsements ===
==== Miller ====
- Kate Michelman, pro-choice activist
- Several Virginia state senators
- Alexandria city councilmembers

==== Webb ====
- U.S. Senator Harry Reid
- U.S. Senator Tom Daschle
- U.S. Senator Dick Durbin
- U.S. Senator Bob Kerrey
- U.S. Senator John Kerry
- U.S. Congressman John Murtha
- U.S. Congresswoman Leslie Byrne
- U.S. Congressman Owen Pickett
- General Wesley Clark
- Former State Delegate Chap Petersen
- Former U.S. Senator Chuck Robb and his staff

=== Finances ===
Federal Election Commission reports show that in the first part of 2006, Miller raised more than twice as much money as Webb, who entered the race in February. (Miller contributed over $1 million to his own campaign, 60% of what he raised.)

=== Campaign ===
The week before the primary, Miller said a Webb campaign flier characterized him in an anti-Semitic way; Webb denied this.

=== Results ===
Democratic primary results
Party	Candidate	Votes	%
Democratic	Jim Webb	83,298	53.47
Democratic	Harris Miller	72,486	46.53
Total votes		155,784	100.00

== General election ==
=== Candidates ===
- George Allen (R), incumbent U.S. senator, former governor, and former U.S. representative from Virginia's 7th congressional district
- Gail Parker (G), Air Force veteran
- Jim Webb (D), former United States Secretary of the Navy

=== Platform ===
Webb focused on his early and outspoken opposition to the war in Iraq, which Allen supported. In a September 4, 2002 opinion piece in The Washington Post, Webb wrote: "A long-term occupation of Iraq would beyond doubt require an adjustment of force levels elsewhere, and could eventually diminish American influence in other parts of the world." Webb's son, a U.S. Marine, served in Iraq.

Allen and Webb differed on other issues. Allen was opposed to abortion rights; Webb supported them. Allen supported George W. Bush's tax cuts while Webb said more of the benefits should have gone to middle-class Americans. Both candidates supported the death penalty, right-to-work laws, and Second Amendment rights.

=== Fundraising ===
Allen retained a substantial lead in fundraising: $6.6 million on hand to Webb's $1.1 million through September 15, 2006.

=== Debates ===
Meet the Press debate
On September 17, 2006, Allen and Webb appeared on NBC's Meet the Press for a debate. Part of the program's debate series on the midterm elections, the debate heavily discussed both the original Gulf War and the present war in Iraq. Host Tim Russert questioned Webb about his initial support for Allen's 2000 U.S. Senate run, as well as what led him to later oppose Allen. Russert also questioned Allen about a remark Webb made concerning his interactions with Allen at the start of the Iraq conflict. Webb asserted that he approached Allen regarding U.S. involvement in the region and cautioned against military action. Webb also claimed that Allen responded to this by saying "You're asking me to be disloyal to the president." After being questioned on this by Russert, Allen clarified by saying "No, it's loyalty to this country, and making sure that our country is unified in, in this, in this effort to disarm Saddam Hussein. That was the point." Allen also addressed what he saw as a weakness in Webb, claiming his opponent wanted to withdraw from Iraq. Webb clarified his belief that the U.S. has a commitment to ensure Iraq is stable before withdrawing, but also reasserted that a permanent U.S. presence in Iraq is not an option.

The debate likewise covered an upcoming vote on the use of coercive interrogation methods on enemy combatants. Allen stated that he had not yet made a decision on how to vote, but stated "Now, the key in all of this is I don't want to stop these interrogations. I'm not for torture, I'm not for waterboarding, but some of these techniques have been very helpful to us, whether they are sleep deprivation, or whether there's loud music. And I need to be absolutely certain that what the interrogations—interrogators are doing now—which is completely fine as far as I'm concerned, protecting Americans—will not be harmed by the proposal." Webb expressed that this was an issue close to him as a former soldier, but also stated that he did not believe interrogations should be ended completely. Webb however reaffirmed his concerns that if the U.S. abandons the Geneva Convention its soldiers will suffer abroad.

Russert questioned Webb on the recent allegations that his 1979 Washingtonian article fostered hostility towards female students at the Naval Academy. Webb responded as he had in prior press releases, expressing his regret for the repercussions of the article. Russert similarly asked Allen about a statement he made in 2000 in the pages of American Enterprise magazine: "If [Virginia Military Institute] admitted women, it wouldn't be the VMI that we've known for 154 years. You just don't treat women the way you treat fellow cadets. If you did, it would be ungentlemanly, it would be improper." Allen responded that VMI has made great progress in a co-ed curriculum, making women cadets more of a possibility than at the time he made the statement.

- Complete video of debate, September 17, 2006

This Week debate
On September 18, 2006, George Stephanopoulos moderated a debate between Allen and Webb, as part of his program This Week on ABC. Topics included national security, Iraq, the economy, the conduct of the campaign, and other issues.

- Complete video of debate, September 18, 2006

League of Women Voters debate
On October 9, 2006, the League of Women Voters sponsored a debate between Allen and Webb. The format consisted of the candidates answering series of questions from the moderator, from the LWV panel, and finally from each other. Largely, the responses from the candidates did not expand on the body of knowledge already present in their television and radio commercials. The overall feel of the debate was somewhat combative, with Allen frequently going overtime on responses and a round of uncontrolled verbal jousting after Allen cited Webb's prior statements on raising taxes.

- Complete video of debate, October 9, 2006

=== Predictions ===
Source	Ranking	As of
The Cook Political Report	Tossup	November 6, 2006
Sabato's Crystal Ball	Tilt D (flip)	November 6, 2006
Rothenberg Political Report	Lean D (flip)	November 6, 2006
Real Clear Politics	Tossup	November 6, 2006

=== Endorsement ===
Jim Webb (D)

Individuals

- Wesley Clark, general, 2004 democratic presidential candidate

=== Polling ===
Source	Date	Jim Webb (D)	George Allen (R)	Gail Parker (IG)
Rasmussen	December 9, 2005	26%	57%	
Rasmussen	February 14, 2006	37%	49%	
Rasmussen	March 28, 2006	30%	54%	
Zogby/WSJ	March 31, 2006	42%	49%	
Rasmussen	April 19, 2006	30%	50%	
Rasmussen	June 20, 2006	41%	51%	
Zogby/WSJ	June 21, 2006	44%	49%	
Associated Press/Ipsos	June 27, 2006	39%	46%	
Survey USA	June 28, 2006	37%	56%	2%
Zogby	July 15, 2006	37%	47%	
Zogby/WSJ	July 24, 2006	41%	52%	
Rasmussen	July 27, 2006	39%	50%	
Mason-Dixon	July 30, 2006	32%	48%	
Rasmussen	August 17, 2006	42%	47%	
SurveyUSA	August 21, 2006	45%	48%	2%
Zogby/WSJ	August 27, 2006	48%	47%	
Mason-Dixon	September 10, 2006	42%	46%	
Zogby/WSJ	September 10, 2006	50%	43%	
SurveyUSA	September 13, 2006	45%	48%	3%
Rasmussen	September 15, 2006	43%	50%	
Mason-Dixon/MSNBC	September 23–27, 2006	43%	43%	2%
SurveyUSA	September 27, 2006	44%	49%	2%
Zogby/WSJ	September 28, 2006	44%	49%	
SurveyUSA	September 29, 2006	44%	50%	2%
Rasmussen	October 2, 2006	43%	49%	
Reuters/Zogby	October 5, 2006	37%	48%	
USA Today/Gallup	October 6, 2006	45%	48%	
Rasmussen	October 12, 2006	46%	49%	
The Washington Post	October 15, 2006	47%	49%	2%
Zogby/WSJ	October 19, 2006	47%	50%	
Mason-Dixon	October 23, 2006	43%	47%	2%
Los Angeles Times/Bloomberg	October 24, 2006	47%	44%	
SurveyUSA	October 25, 2006	46%	49%	2%
Rasmussen	October 27, 2006	48%	49%	
GHY (D)	October 26–29, 2006	47%	43%	
Zogby/WSJ	October 28, 2006	51%	47%	
Rasmussen	October 29, 2006	51%	46%	
CNN	October 31, 2006	50%	46%	
Rasmussen	November 2, 2006	49%	49%	
Reuters/Zogby	November 2, 2006	45%	44%	
Gallup	November 1–3, 2006	46%	49%	
Mason-Dixon	November 4, 2006	46%	45%	2%
SurveyUSA	November 6, 2006	52%	44%	2%

=== Results ===
United States Senate election in Virginia, 2006
Party	Candidate	Votes	%	±%
Democratic	Jim Webb	1,175,606	49.59%	+1.91%
Republican	George Allen (incumbent)	1,166,277	49.20%	−3.05%
Independent Greens	Gail Parker	26,102	1.10%	+1.10%
Write-in		2,460	0.10%	+0.04%
Total votes		2,370,445	100.00%	N/A
Democratic gain from Republican				

==== Counties and independent cities that flipped from Democratic to Republican ====
- Prince Edward (largest municipality: Farmville)
- Southampton (largest municipality: Courtland)

==== Counties and independent cities that flipped from Republican to Democratic ====
- Alleghany (largest borough: Clifton Forge)
- Russell (largest city: Lebanon)
- Loudoun (largest borough: Leesburg)
- Prince William (largest borough: Manassas)
- Nelson (largest municipality: Nellysford)
- Rappahannock (largest city: Washington)
- Montgomery (largest borough: Blacksburg)

==== By congressional district ====
Despite losing, Allen won seven of 11 congressional districts, including one that elected a Democrat. Webb won four, including two that elected Republicans.

District	Allen*	Webb	Representative
1st	54%	44%	Jo Ann Davis
2nd	51%	48%	Thelma Drake
3rd	31%	68%	Robert C. Scott
4th	54%	45%	Randy Forbes
5th	54%	45%	Virgil Goode
6th	58%	40%	Bob Goodlatte
7th	57%	42%	Eric Cantor
8th	30%	69%	Jim Moran
9th	55%	44%	Rick Boucher
10th	49%	50%	Frank Wolf
11th	44%	55%	Thomas M. Davis

== Controversies ==
The controversies involved both Allen and Webb. However, a majority of these controversies negatively impacted Allen and are believed to have contributed to his defeat in the November election.

=== Allen's Barr Labs investment ===
On August 8, 2006, it was reported that Allen, who opposes abortion rights, owned stock in Barr Laboratories, maker of the Plan B "morning-after pill", an emergency contraceptive intended to prevent pregnancy if taken within 72 hours of intercourse. The Webb campaign criticized Allen for holding stock in a company that makes a product that many of his supporters oppose. Allen responded that he held the stock because Barr Labs had created jobs in Virginia and pointed to his consistently anti-abortion voting record. He indicated that he had no plans to sell the stock.

=== Allen's macaca controversy ===
On August 11, 2006, George Allen twice called S.R. Sidarth, a 20-year-old Webb campaign volunteer, macaca. Sidarth is of Indian ancestry, but was born and raised in Fairfax County, Virginia. As a "tracker" for the opposing Webb campaign, Sidarth was filming an Allen campaign stop in Breaks, Virginia, near the Kentucky border.

During a speech, Allen paused, then began referring to Sidarth:

This fellow here over here with the yellow shirt, Macaca, or whatever his name is. He's with my opponent. He's following us around everywhere. And it's just great. We're going to places all over Virginia, and he's having it on film and it's great to have you here and you show it to your opponent because he's never been there and probably will never come. [...] Let's give a welcome to Macaca, here. Welcome to America and the real world of Virginia.

According to Sidarth, he was the only non-white person present among the crowd of 100 or so Republican supporters, some of whom applauded Allen's remarks.

The Webb campaign accused Allen of using a racial insult; macaca has been identified as a Francophone epithet for North African indigenes, and commentators have suggested that he may have heard the slur from his mother, Henrietta "Etty" Allen, who was of North African Jewish (in Allen's case, a Tunisian) French background. During a televised debate on September 18, reporter Peggy Fox asked Allen if he had learned the slur from his mother; Etty Allen denied that she had ever used the word before.

According to The Washington Post, Allen's campaign manager initially dismissed the incident with an expletive. Allen later said that he had heard his staff use the term macaca in reference to Sidarth, that he did not know what the word meant, and that he did not intend to insult Sidarth's ethnicity when he singled him out to the crowd. "I do apologize if he's offended by that," Allen said, adding that "I would never want to demean him as an individual."

Shortly after, Allen's campaign held that he used the word in reference to Sidarth's hairstyle. Although Sidarth was wearing a baseball cap on the day of the incident, he had been conversing casually with Allen's aides during campaign stops before the incident. Allen's campaign staff claim to have referred to him privately as "Mohawk". A now widely disseminated photo of Sidarth, hosted by the Webb campaign, shows Sidarth's hair to be longer in the middle and shaved on the sides, typical of a mohawk.

On August 15, 2006, John Reid, Allen's communications director, told The New York Times that members of Allen's campaign had "good-naturedly" nicknamed Sidarth "Mohawk" when speaking among themselves, but could not explain how the word might have morphed into macaca. Reid told the Times that Sidarth only received a nickname from Allen campaign staff because he would not give his real name. Interviewed that day on CNN, however, Sidarth recalled shaking Allen's hand earlier in the week and giving his name. "He's very good with names, legendarily. He tries very hard to remember people's names when meeting them," Sidarth said. As for the macaca remark, "I am disappointed that someone like a Senator of the United States could use something [so] completely offensive."

On August 16, 2006, the National Journal reported that two Virginia Republicans who heard the word used by Allen's campaign staff said macaca was a neologism created from mohawk and caca, Spanish and French slang for excrement. The National Journal quoted a Republican close to the campaign saying, "In other words, [Sidarth] was a shit-head, an annoyance."

By August 20, 2006, Allen began insisting that he had never before heard the word, and that he simply made it up, contrary to original explanations from Allen and his staff.

After several public apologies, Allen called Sidarth twelve days after the incident, on August 23, to apologize directly for his remarks. Allen's campaign manager Dick Wadhams continued to blame opponent Webb, the media, and Allen's "leftist" foes for a "feeding frenzy." The incident reduced Allen's once-broad polling margin over Webb to single digits.

On September 19, John Podhoretz used the name "Felix Macacawitz" as a headline for a post in the National Review blog "The Corner". On October 4, field organizer Meryl Ibis resigned after she used the name in an email to supporters of Al Weed, the Democratic Party candidate for US representative in a Virginia district.

Some political observers believe the incident shows an early-21st-century shift in American politics. Salon.com named Sidarth its 2006 Person of the Year. Michael Scherer wrote, "Sidarth was the kid next door. He, not Allen, was the real Virginian. He was proof that every hour his native commonwealth drifts further from the orbit of the GOP's solid South and toward a day when Allen's act will be a tacky antique. Allen was the past, Sidarth is the wired, diverse future—of Virginia, the political process and the country."

Relating to the Allen controversy, "Macaca" was named the most politically incorrect word of 2006 on December 15 by Global Language Monitor, a non-profit group that studies word usage.

Sidarth later embraced the term in a The Washington Post opinion piece titled "I Am Macaca". Weeks following Allen's comment, Sidarth wrote an entrance essay for a Larry Sabato-taught class at the University of Virginia of only three words: "I am macaca".

=== Webb's Reagan ad ===
On September 7, 2006, Webb released his first television advertisement. It featured footage of a 1985 speech by Ronald Reagan praising Webb at the secretary's alma mater, the United States Naval Academy in 1985.

The next day, an official working for the Reagan Presidential Foundation faxed a letter to Webb's campaign on behalf of former first lady Nancy Reagan, urging them not to air the advertisement. In response, Webb told reporters that if Ronald Reagan had made any speeches about Allen his opponent's campaign would probably use them, too. "I would encourage them to try to go find some."

The Webb advertisement also aired in Norfolk, Roanoke, and Northern Virginia.

The Reagan Library has asked other political campaigns to pull advertising involving the former president's image. In 2004, it criticized the conservative Club for Growth for an advertisement comparing George W. Bush to Reagan.

On September 15, 2006, a Washington Post editorial supported Webb's advertisement and chided the Allen campaign for crying foul, saying that neither protest by Allen's campaign or Reagan's Library (later corrected to the Reagan Presidential Foundation) has any merit:

The president is a public official, paid by the taxpayers. His speeches are in the public domain; they belong to all Americans, and to history. His words may fairly be the subject of bitter debate and divergent interpretation for decades or centuries to come, but they should not be censored posthumously. In this instance, Mr. Webb has neither distorted Mr. Reagan's words nor taken them out of context; nor did Mr. Reagan ever repudiate them.

=== Allen at Fairfax County Republican Committee's ethnic rally ===
On September 9, 2006, Allen attended, along with other Republican elected officials and candidates for public office, an "ethnic community rally" at Thomas Edison High School in Fairfax County, Virginia. The Fairfax County Republican Committee, together with several ethnically based Republican groups, had sponsored this event for the past several years. Participating organizations included local Republican groups drawn from the Asian-American, Black, and Latino communities, among others. A small group of protesters demonstrated outside the high school, including one activist dressed in a gorilla costume as a reference to Allen's macaca remark. One protester said she was there "to let him [George Allen] know that racism is not acceptable", while another protester suggested that Allen was "holding a fake diversity rally".

Both Allen and Webb's supporters video-recorded the event. Webb supporters claim the videos show more white faces than non-white. The Virginian-Pilot described the crowd as chiefly Asian-American. Webb, according to exit polls, went on to win all minority groups overwhelmingly, including Asian Americans.

=== Candidates' stances on women in combat ===
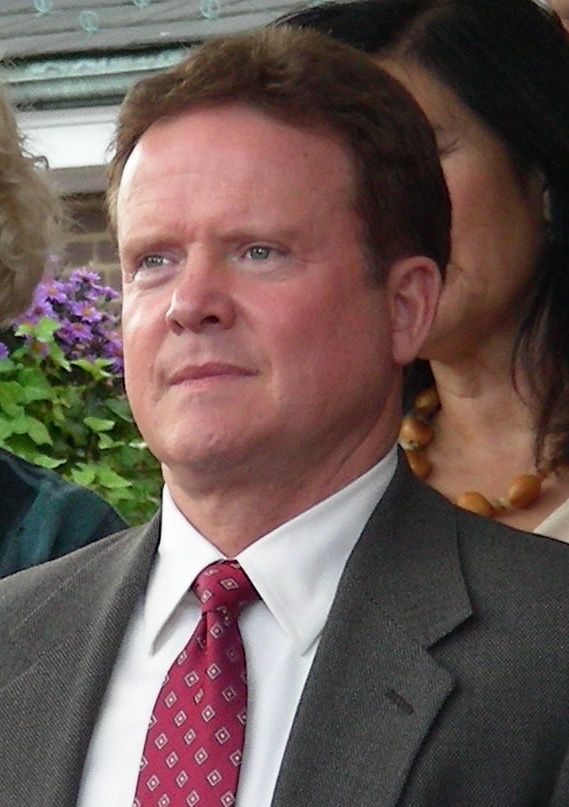
Jim Webb at a rally, c. September 20, 2006

On September 13, 2006, five female graduates of the United States Naval Academy had a press conference promoted by the Allen campaign to assail a Washingtonian article Webb wrote in 1979. They accuse Webb of fostering an air of hostility and harassment towards females within the academy. In the article, entitled "Women Can't Fight", Webb described his personal experiences in the Vietnam War as a U.S. Marine infantry officer, and explained why he believed combat was an inappropriate environment for women. Webb also wrote that he had never met a woman "whom [he] would trust to provide those men with combat leadership". The article also characterized the Naval Academy dormitory situation as "a horny woman's dream", due to the ratio of men to women being 13 1/3 to 1 at the time.

The five women, who attended the Naval Academy from the late 1970s to early 1980s, asserted that the article led to male midshipmen constantly harassing and humiliating them. Some even went so far as to wear "Jim Webb Fan Club" T-shirts.

In response to the allegations, Webb's campaign released a statement that he wrote the article during a time of great emotional debate over a wide array of social issues in this country, and the tone of this article was no exception. He added that he is "completely comfortable" with the present roles of women within the Naval Academy and the modern military. Webb expressed that at the time he wrote the article he did not anticipate its effects, "and to the extent that my writing subjected women at the Academy or the active Armed Forces to undue hardship, I remain profoundly sorry."

Allen himself has come under fire for similar attitudes he supported regarding the Virginia Military Institute. Allen remarked in 2000 that women "should not be in foxholes", and that "[t]he purpose of the armed services is not to be a social experiment". A 2000 candidate-guide published by the Virginian-Pilot reiterated this stance of Allen's.

=== Allen's remarks about his partial Jewish heritage ===
In the wake of the Macaca controversy, the Jewish periodical The Forward reported that in all likelihood, Allen's mother Etty Allen, née Henrietta Lumbroso, was Jewish "from the august Sephardic Jewish Lumbroso family", and that therefore by the Jewish legal rule of matrilineal descent, Allen himself would be considered Jewish.

On September 18, 2006, Allen and Webb debated each other at the Fairfax County Chamber of Commerce. One of the more interesting aspects of this debate came when Allen was questioned by WUSA-TV anchor Peggy Fox. Fox said: "It has been reported [that] your grandfather Felix, whom you were given your middle name for, was Jewish. Could you please tell us whether your forebears include Jews and, if so, at which point Jewish identity might have ended?" This led to a booing from the crowd and anger from Allen who admonished Fox for "making aspersions" and responded: "To be getting into what religion my mother is, I don't think is relevant...Why is that relevant -- my religion, Jim's religion or the religious beliefs of anyone out there?...My mother is French-Italian with a little Spanish blood in her." The next day, Allen issued a statement both confirming and distancing himself from his mother's Jewish ancestry. The statement read:

I was raised as a Christian and my mother was raised as a Christian. And I embrace and take great pride in every aspect of my diverse heritage, including my Lumbroso family line's Jewish heritage, which I learned about from a recent magazine article and my mother confirmed.

Allen also told the Richmond Times-Dispatch, in a reference to kosher dieting, "I still had a ham sandwich for lunch. And my mother made great pork chops." The Washington Post reported that Allen's mother feared retribution against her family if her religious and ethnic background became public, and had originally asked Allen to keep that information private. Although no mention is made of her mother's religion in Allen's sister's book, she does mention that the Catholic Church, before marrying the couple, required Allen's parents to agree that any children would be raised Catholic, and as a result they decided to be married by a justice of the peace in the home of a Jewish friend.

=== PAC ad on Allen's body armor vote ===
In mid-September, VoteVets.org, a political action committee formed in 2006 that is primarily composed of former Iraq and Afghanistan veterans and headed by Jon Soltz, released a television advertisement criticizing Allen for voting against body armor for US troops in 2003. The claim was based on Allen's vote against a Democratic amendment that would have increased National Guard funding for body armor.

Various organizations subsequently attempted to assess the validity of the claim. The Arizona Republic ran a piece headlined "VoteVets ad is pure deceit." FactCheck.org said the ad contained "false claims." But Media Matters for America said Allen voted against troop body armor not once, but twice.

In March 2003, Allen voted against a bill that "targets shortfalls identified by the National Guard and Reserve in their Unfunded Requirement lists," including the shortage of helmets, tents, bullet-proof inserts, and tactical vests. On October 2, 2003, Allen voted against a Democratic amendment by Senator Christopher Dodd to add $322 million to the $300 million (for body armor and battlefield cleanup) that the Senate Appropriations Committee had already attached to an $87 billion emergency supplemental bill.

=== Allen's use of racial epithets ===
Salon published a story in late September reporting that three of Allen's former college football teammates said that during the 1970s, Allen repeatedly used the word "nigger" and demonstrated racist attitudes toward blacks. On September 29, Edward Sabornie, a professor at North Carolina State University who had been in Allen's class and played football with him, decided to go on record with his allegations. Sabornie had commented under condition of anonymity in Salon's previous article about Allen's use of the slur. In that article, he was described as a "white teammate" and commented that using racial epithets "was so common with George when he was among his white friends. [It was] the terminology he used." Sabornie also recalled Allen as having referred to blacks as "roaches" and Latinos as "wetbacks".

Following the first Salon article, pundit Larry Sabato, who attended the University of Virginia at the same time as Allen, stated on a televised interview that he knew for a fact that Allen used the epithet. Sabato later recanted saying that he had only heard that rumor from someone else. Allen called the claims "ludicrously false", explaining, "[t]he story and [Shelton's] comments and assertions in [the claim] are completely false. I don't remember ever using that word and it is absolutely false that that was ever part of my vocabulary."

=== Sons of Confederate Veterans ===
On September 28, 2006, the Sons of Confederate Veterans criticized Allen when the group claimed Allen criticized Southern heritage by stating that he had come to recognize that the Confederate Battle flag had negative racial overtones.

=== Webb's use of racial epithets ===
In late September, Webb was asked if he had ever used the word "nigger". Webb replied that "I don't think that there's anyone who grew up around the South that hasn't had the word pass through their lips at one time in their life." Webb noted that the word and many other epithets were in Fields of Fire, a novel Webb wrote about the Vietnam War.

Allen campaign officials referred reporters to Dan Cragg, a former acquaintance of Webb's. Cragg said that Webb told him in 1963 that Webb and members of his ROTC unit at the University of Southern California would "hop into their cars, and would go down to Watts", taking fake rifles, and yell out epithets, "point the rifles at them [black people], pull the triggers and then drive off laughing." Cragg had recorded the interview in which he claimed the anecdote was related, but it is absent from the tape. Spokeswoman Kristian Denny Todd quoted Webb as saying: "In 1963, you couldn't go to Watts and do that kind of thing. You'd get killed. So of course I didn't do it. I would never do that. I would never want to do that." Webb also produced a friend from the time who claimed that the two had never driven to Watts as claimed.

An October 18, 2006, article in The Washington Post quotes a recent interview with Webb concerning the portrayal of ethnic stereotypes in Hollywood. Webb said, "Towel-heads and rednecks -- of which I am one. If you write that word, please say that. I mean, I don't use that pejoratively, I use it defensively. Towel-heads and rednecks became the easy villains in so many movies out there".

=== Allen's undisclosed business interests ===
On October 8, 2006, the Associated Press, reviewing five years of Allen's financial records, reported that Allen did not properly report income and stock options from companies which have federal contracts, and contacted the Army to help a company in which he has an interest. Allen's staff said Allen believed in "good faith" that he did not need to report the stock options because their purchase price was higher than the current market value.

Following the AP report, Allen asked the Senate ethics committee for an opinion on whether he should have disclosed his options. The ethics committee ruled than Allen was not required to disclose his stock options, and did not err in not doing so.

=== Webb's name truncated on ballots ===
On October 24, 2006, The Washington Post reported that Webb's last name would be truncated on electronic ballots used in Alexandria, Falls Church and Charlottesville. Webb's name should have appeared as James H. 'Jim' Webb but only James H. 'Jim' showed on a summary page due to the font size used on the InterCivic voting machines. Allen's name George F. Allen was not affected by this glitch. The Virginia State Board of Elections pledged to have it fixed by the 2007 statewide elections and to post signs warning voters of this error.

=== Sexually explicit passages from Webb novels ===
On October 26, 2006, the Drudge Report posted a press release reprinting and commenting on sexually explicit passages from Webb's novels. One excerpt involved a man placing his son's penis in his mouth; others involved allegedly sexist portrayals of women. The press release, which the Drudge Report attributed to the Allen campaign, said the passages fit "a continued pattern of demeaning women" in which Webb "refuse[s] to portray women in a respectful, positive light". Allen's campaign refused to tell a local radio news station, WTOP-FM, whether it in fact had issued a news release on the matter.

In a radio interview on October 27, 2006, Webb described the Allen campaign's tactics as "smear after smear", and called the attack on his fiction baseless "character assassination". Webb defended his fiction work, saying that "the duty of a writer is to illuminate [his] surroundings". He said that the scene involving the man and his son was based upon an incident in a Bangkok slum that he witnessed as a journalist and that it was "not a sexual act".

Responding to the controversy, Allen stated: "My record as a United States senator is an open book. My opponent has a record as well. He, in his advertisements, points out that he's an author, that he's a writer of books. That's part of his record. These passages in his books are part of his open record. I'll let the people of Virginia be the judge as to whose record they are more comfortable with."

At a campaign rally in Annandale on October 28, 2006, Webb noted that his novel Fields of Fire has been on the Commandant of the Marine Corps reading list for twenty years and claimed that it is the "most-taught piece of literature regarding the Vietnam War" on college campuses. Webb further listed the various accolades his books have received.

=== Allen's arrest warrant records ===
The Democratic Senatorial Campaign Committee has criticized Allen for his refusal to release documents that would potentially shed light on the multiple warrants that were issued for his arrest in 1974.

=== Allen supporters attack blogger ===
On October 31, footage of multiple Allen supporters attacking a constituent, Mike Stark, during a campaign stop in Charlottesville, Virginia began to circulate among various news organizations and online sources. Stark, a liberal blogger, Marine veteran and law student, attempted to ask Allen about his missing arrest records and the reasons for the sealing of his divorce papers. After yelling out a question about rumors of Allen having assaulted his first wife, Stark was "briefly placed in a headlock, restrained, slung to the ground, and forcibly escorted from the hotel by three Allen supporters". Stark was detained several days later at another rally after an Allen supporter claimed Stark pushed him to the ground.

=== Telephone intimidation ===
The FBI launched an investigation into alleged attempts to intimidate potential Democratic voters in eight counties before the poll, by use of telephone calls to suggest that persons with outstanding warrants would be arrested as they voted, a classic example of voter suppression.

== Analysis ==
Virginia had historically been one of the more Republican Southern states. For instance, it was the only Southern state not to vote for Jimmy Carter in 1976. Prior to the 2006 election, its congressional delegation was mostly conservative, with eight of eleven Representatives and both Senators belonging to the Republican Party, making its Congressional delegation the most Republican of any Southern state. Despite this, Democrats had won the gubernatorial races in 2001 and 2005. The state's political majority has been changing from conservative white to a mixture of races, especially Hispanic. The state is increasingly diverse; it has the highest percentage of Asians (4.7%, according to the 2005 American Community Survey of the U.S. Census) of any Southern state. 9.9% of Virginians are foreign-born. Webb, like Governor Tim Kaine in 2005, won the four major fast-growing counties in Northern Virginia outside Washington, D.C.; Fairfax County, Loudoun, Prince William and Arlington. In 2008, President Barack Obama carried Virginia by a 6.3% margin over Republican Senator John McCain, while the Democratic nominee for Senate, Mark Warner, won the open seat, defeating Republican candidate Jim Gilmore by over 30 points.

When results began coming in, Allen quickly built a sizeable lead, which began to narrow as the night went on. With 90% of precincts reporting, Allen held a lead of about 30,000 votes, or about 1.5%. However, as votes began to come in from population-heavy Richmond, Webb narrowed the gap, and pulled ahead within the last 1 or 2% of precincts to report. Preliminary results showed Webb holding a lead of 8,942 votes, and many news organizations hesitated to call the election for either candidate until the next day. At 8:41 PM EST on November 8, AP declared Webb the winner. Webb was the sixth Democrat to defeat an incumbent Republican Senator in 2006, and his victory gave Democrats control of the Senate. In all Virginia elections, if the margin of defeat is less than half of a percentage point, the Commonwealth of Virginia allows the apparent losing candidate to request a recount, paid for by the local jurisdictions. If the margin of defeat is between one and one-half of a percentage point, the losing candidate is still entitled to request a recount, but must cover its expense. Because the difference was less than 0.5%, George Allen could have requested a recount paid for by the government, but declined to make such a request. That was likely because:

- Even in large jurisdictions, recounts—such as those in Florida in 2000 and Washington's 2004 gubernatorial election—rarely result in a swing of more than 1,000 votes, and Allen was trailing by almost 10,000 in the initial count. In particular, almost all votes in this Virginia election were cast using electronic voting machines, whose results are unlikely to change in a recount.
- There was wide speculation that calling for a recount (and still losing) would give Allen a "sore loser" label, which would hurt his future election campaigns, including what some speculated might still involve a 2008 presidential run. However, after losing the senatorial election, on December 10, 2006, Allen announced that he would not be running for president in 2008.

== See also ==
- 2006 United States Senate elections
