= Raising Cain (disambiguation) =

Raising Cain is a phrase that means causing trouble or disruption, and is derived from the Biblical story of Cain and Abel. The phrase has been the basis for various examples of word play involving homophones of one or both of its words. These include:

== "Cain" ==
- Raising Cain, a 1992 American film directed by Brian De Palma
- Raisin' Cain, a 1980 album by Johnny Winter
- Raising Cain: The Life and Politics of Senator Harry P. Cain, a 2018 biography of U.S. Senator Harry P. Cain, written by C. Mark Smith
- Raisin' Cain, a 1929 musical revue by Ida Cox and her husband Jesse Crump

== "Caine" ==
- "Raising Caine", a 2008 episode of the American television show CSI: Miami
- Dan Caine, U.S. Air Force general and Chairman of the Joint Chiefs of Staff, nicknamed "Dan 'Raizin' Caine"
- Raising Caine, a 2015 science fiction novel by Charles E. Gannon

== "Cane" ==
- Raising Cane's Chicken Fingers, an American fast food chain
  - Raising Cane's River Center, an entertainment complex in downtown Baton Rouge, Louisiana
  - Raising Cane's River Center Arena, a multi-purpose arena in Baton Rouge, Louisiana
- Raising Cane: The World of Plantation Hawaii, a 1994 non-fiction book by Ronald Takaki

== "Kaine" ==
- Raising Kaine, a Virginia political blog active between 2005 and 2008

== "Kane" ==
- "Raising Kane", a 1971 book-length essay by American film critic Pauline Kael about the 1941 film Citizen Kane
- Raisin' Kane, a 2001 Canadian film directed by Alison Duke

== See also ==
- Raisin bran, American breakfast cereal brand similar to, but not derived from the term
