= Mike Stark =

American journalist

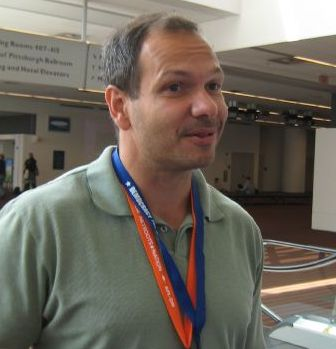
Stark at the 2009 Netroots Nation convention

Mike Stark is an American reporter, blogger, political activist, computer programmer/developer, and graduate of the University of Virginia School of Law. His work often appears at StarkReports.com, The Huffington Post, Daily Kos and several other group-blogs. He was a panelist at the 2006 and 2007 Yearly Kos conventions.

== Activities as a computer programmer ==
Mike Stark briefly worked for Matrix Intermedia Corporation (circa 2002) as a back-end developer for a proprietary content management system under the guidance of Alan Evans, Brenda Meltz-Helm, and Jeremy Bailey. Mr. Stark left the company later that same year to pursue his goal of obtaining a Juris Doctor degree.

== Activities related to Calling All Wingnuts blog ==
Using his former blog, CallingAllWingnuts.com, as an organizing tool, Stark recruited a team of individuals willing to volunteer time calling into various conservative radio shows. The first call-in campaign was directed at Bill O'Reilly's Radio Factor. It was a response to O'Reilly's creation of a petition on his website that called for the replacement of Keith Olbermann and cancellation of his show, Countdown with Keith Olbermann. Stark encouraged callers to tell O'Reilly how much they enjoyed Olbermann's television show. Over the course of the week, approximately 15 callers that Stark recruited were put on the air with O'Reilly. As they mentioned Olbermann's name, they were disconnected by the host, with O'Reilly threatening to send the number to "Fox security" to contact "local authorities" if they say anything "obscene or untoward."

== Reporting on Senator Allen's reelection bid ==
In August 2006, in the immediate aftermath of George Allen's macaca incident, Stark attended a Chamber of Commerce luncheon in Harrisonburg, Virginia. Senator Allen was the featured speaker. At the conclusion of the Senator's speech, Stark approached the Senator and asked, "Senator Allen, given what's been in the news, some of the law students are wondering... have you ever used the word 'nigger'?"

Allen responded, "What? No..."

Stark pressed, "Never in your life?"

Allen replied, "No... No."

Stark continued, "Well, can you explain the confederate flag and the noose you kept in your office?"

Eventually Allen's staff had Stark ejected from the hotel premises and the rest of the Senator's campaign events scheduled for that day were canceled.

Stark posted the audio of the exchange at his blog.

Two months later, on October 31, 2006, Stark attended another campaign rally and asked Allen about the senator's arrest record and prevailing rumors of prior spousal abuse. A widely seen video that aired on national news programs showed Allen's campaign staffers wrestling Stark to the ground after Stark asked the Senator, "Senator Allen: did you spit on your first wife?" Later that day Stark filed a complaint with the local police department, which served search warrants to local TV stations who had recorded the incident. After review, the commonwealth's attorney decided not to charge anyone, but noted that Stark had the right to bring evidence before a magistrate. Through April 2007, Stark has not chosen to do so.

Several days later, Stark was briefly detained and handcuffed, but not arrested, at another Allen rally after an Allen supporter claimed Stark pushed him to the ground.

"Wingnuts" is a neologism referring to far-right conservatives. Allen's campaign noted that the Calling All Wingnuts blog is subtitled Kickin' ass on the lyin' side: A never-ending battle against stupid, ugly, deceitful and corrupt right-wing water carriers.

== Highlighting violent speech on talk radio ==
Stark has also drawn attention for his support of anonymous blogger Spocko in his efforts to bring what he called "violent commentary" on San Francisco area radio station KSFO to the attention of its advertisers. In an interview on CNN's Reliable Sources on the topic in January 2007, Stark described himself as a "champion of the First Amendment.

== Bill O'Reilly feud revisited ==
In the summer of 2007, Bill O'Reilly sent a film crew to confront JetBlue CEO David Barger outside his apartment regarding JetBlue's sponsorship of the YearlyKos convention. O'Reilly drew criticism for approaching a private citizen at his home.

Stark responded by confronting O'Reilly outside his home. He distributed copies of O'Reilly's sexual harassment lawsuit to O'Reilly's neighbors, and put up signs that read "Bill O'Reilly: LIAR", "Bill O'Reilly: PERVERT", and "Bill O'Reilly: CAN'T BE TRUSTED WITH YOUR DAUGHTERS" in his neighborhood. Later that morning, Stark approached the television and radio show host as he retrieved his newspaper. A journalist that accompanied Stark took pictures and video. Stark's action drew both praise and criticism in the blogging world, and earned him the title of "Worser Person in the World" on Olbermann's TV show.

== Arrests ==
In October 2018, Stark was arrested and charged with battery after assaulting the campaign manager, Kristin Davison, of Nevada Attorney General Adam Laxalt, who at the time was running for Governor. Stark was accused of grabbing Davison's arm and twisting it behind her back as she yelled "Stop hurting me!" Stark was working for the liberal super PAC American Bridge 21st Century at the time. Earlier that year, Stark had been charged with assault for allegedly using his body to push a top aide, Heather Swift, to the United States Department of the Interior Secretary Ryan Zinke outside a congressional hearing. Stark and American Bridge denied the assault. However, Stark spent a night in jail over the incident.

In 2017, Stark was arrested during an incident at a parade in Fairfax County, Virginia. The video of the violent arrest spread quickly online. Stark was trying to confront then-Republican gubernatorial candidate Ed Gillespie at the October 2017 parade. In February 2018, Stark was initially found guilty of misdemeanor disorderly conduct and fined $500. A charge of fleeing police was dismissed. Stark appealed his municipal court conviction, and, in exchange for agreeing to forgo litigation against the county, police, or any of its subsidiaries, all charges were dismissed.
