= Born Fighting =

2004 non-fiction book by James "Jim" Webb

Born Fighting: How the Scots-Irish Shaped America
- Author: James Webb
- Language: English
- Genre: History
- Publisher: Broadway Books
- Publication date: October 5, 2004
- Publication place: United States
- Pages: 384
- ISBN: 0-7679-1688-3

Born Fighting: How the Scots-Irish Shaped America is a book by American politician and author James "Jim" Webb. It describes the history of the Scots-Irish ethnic group, summarising their Scottish roots and time in Ulster and the Plantation of Ulster before entering a more elaborate narrative of their time in the United States. Webb describes what he considers to be their inherent characteristics, such as their senses of militarism, independence and staunch opposition to adversaries. He notes their roles in the creation of country music and the Bible Belt.

Webb notes how the Scots-Irish played significant roles in American conflicts, particularly the American Civil War, largely as Confederates, and the Vietnam War. Webb describes what he feels has been the "Nazification" of the Confederate cause, emphasising that only five percent of Southerners were slave owners and detailing the economic crippling of the South by the Northern-based government, both before and after the conflict. Webb also describes the vilification of soldiers in the Vietnam War at the hands of a liberal, anti-war public.

The book was generally praised. Writing for the Ashbrook Center, Mackubin Thomas Owens of the Naval War College praised the book as a "tour de force", agreeing with Webb that American politicians need to take more notice of the Scots-Irish. Jeff Minick of Smoky Mountain Living magazine described it as "vivid". Kirkus Reviews, while questioning the underlying message of the book, found "plenty of good information and interpretation". However, historian Michael S. Newton was deeply critical of the book, among many complaints writing that Webb "comes across as an apologist for the legacy of racism in the South". He accused Webb of "taking history personally" and generally lambasted the book for what seemed to be an intentionally misleading narrative.

Born Fighting was the basis for a two-part Smithsonian Channel program on the Scots-Irish influence in America.
