= Eduwonkette =

Education blog

Eduwonkette was an initially anonymous blog written by education researcher Jennifer Jennings. It was originally published independently, but was “quickly” picked up by Education Week where it now appears. Gothamist called the blog "a regular irritant to the Dept. of Education and the Bloomberg administration."

"Eduwonkette" told an interviewer for The New York Sun that she preserves her anonymity because "Universities expect us to devote our time exclusively to research, and blogging is a hard sell in that environment," she said. "It's still a new enough activity that universities don't quite know how to appraise its value."

Historian of education Diane Ravitch called Eduwonkette's work "brilliant." Others criticized her for maintaining anonymity on the grounds that the identities, and thereby the biases, of participants in public debates on education ought to be known. The blog broke stories that were later picked up by the press.

In August 2008, a story in New York magazine revealed Eduwonkette to be Jennings, then a sociology graduate student at Columbia University. On January 26, 2009, she announced that she was "hanging up her cape" to join the sociology department at New York University.
