= Fields of Fire (novel) =

1978 novel by James "Jim" Webb

- First edition
- Author: James Webb
- Language: English
- Subject: Vietnam War, United States Marine Corps
- Genre: Historical fiction
- Publisher: Prentice Hall
- Publication date: 1978
- Publication place: United States
- Media type: Paperback
- Pages: 496 pages
- ISBN: 0-553-58385-9
- OCLC: 47918691
- LC Class: CPB Box no. 1963 vol. 23

Fields of Fire is a novel by U.S. Senator Jim Webb, first published in 1978. It is a work of fiction which depicts a platoon of Marines serving in the Vietnam War.

== Content ==
The novel is told mainly from the viewpoints of three Marines: 2nd Lt. Robert E. Lee Hodges, who comes from a long line of soldiers; "Snake" (no full name given), a squad leader in Hodges' platoon, a tough kid from the streets; and "Senator" (Will Goodrich), an impressionable and sensitive Harvard student who volunteers for service. The major themes are centered on loyalty, leadership, and the brutalizing effects on people in a time of war. Written only three years after the last American troops withdrew from Vietnam, and despite being written by a man who loved the military and hated the antiwar movement, Fields of Fire points out the flawed logic of the Vietnam War through its hero, Lieutenant Hodges.
