= David Saunders (political strategist) =

American political strategist

David "Mudcat" Saunders is a Democratic political strategist and author. Saunders was a senior advisor in the 2008 Presidential campaign of John Edwards. He is widely credited with playing important roles in the election of Mark Warner to the office of Governor of Virginia in 2001 and the election of Jim Webb to the U.S. Senate in 2006.

Saunders encourages candidates to show respect for rural culture in order to break through some of the social barriers currently keeping some rural white males from voting for Democrats in larger numbers. He often says that once you can break through the culture, people will listen to what you have to say about the issues.

He is co-author, with political strategist Steve Jarding, of a book on the topic, Foxes in the Henhouse: How the Republicans Stole the South and the Heartland, and What the Democrats Must Do to Run 'em Out.

In a 2005 interview with the blog SouthNow, Saunders was asked, "Why did the Democrats lose in 2004?":

They can't fucking count. That's the Democrats' problem. You don't get in the football game and punt on first down. You concede nothing. We conceded 20 states at first and then six more by Labor Day. That's 227 electoral votes. Bush only needed 18 percent of the remaining electoral votes to win.

—

Many feature articles have been written about Saunders, including two cover articles by Matt Labash in the Weekly Standard. In one, he expresses his opinion of "inside the beltway" wisdom:

He told us that he suspected the Potomac River was the holiest in the world, since “you can take the dumbest sonofabitch and put him on the other side of that river and all of a sudden he becomes Good Will Hunting.”

—

In 2006, Saunders was a senior advisor in the 2006 U.S. Senate campaign of Jim Webb in Virginia. He is credited by Jim Webb himself for convincing Webb to run for Senate, as described in this article in Rolling Stone magazine:

In February 2006, Webb called the Democratic political strategist Dave Saunders, and together they plotted to end the career of Senator George Allen, a handsome dunce in the model of George W. who stood to be re-elected by thirty-three points. The Democrats planned to run Harris Miller, an anti-labor lobbyist dedicated to outsourcing IT jobs overseas. Saunders, his drawl as deep and wide as his connections in the tough little Dixie towns where most Democrats fear to tread, persuaded Webb that he was the man to take out first Miller -- who outspent Webb three to one -- then Allen. Saunders, known as "Mudcat" throughout the state, has for years been working on rebuilding Democratic strength in the South through an alliance of African-Americans and the Southern white men he calls "Bubbas." "We were in the same place in terms of 'How do you help people down here?' " says Webb. "How do you get the good out of this culture? At the end of this conversation, I said, "I'll do this. Let's test the theory.".

—

In 2006, Saunders also served on the Advisory Board of the Commonwealth Coalition, a group organized to oppose the Marshall/Newman amendment (2006 amendment to the Virginia constitution banning gay marriage). In regards to Virginia's anti-gay marriage amendment, Saunders was quoted as saying the following:

It is political trickery - it has nothing to do with queers and marriage. It is to help Republicans, in general, unite their base in the name of hate.

—
