= Tracker (politics) =

Person who surveils and records political candidates

A tracker is a person who surveils and records political candidates. While usually passive, they occasionally shout questions. Trackers are employed by rival campaigns, particularly in important races, to follow opponents in the hope of catching them in a gaffe, an inconsistency, or an embarrassing moment, as a part of opposition research. Trackers typically are low-level employees in a campaign, often 20-somethings in their first job after college.

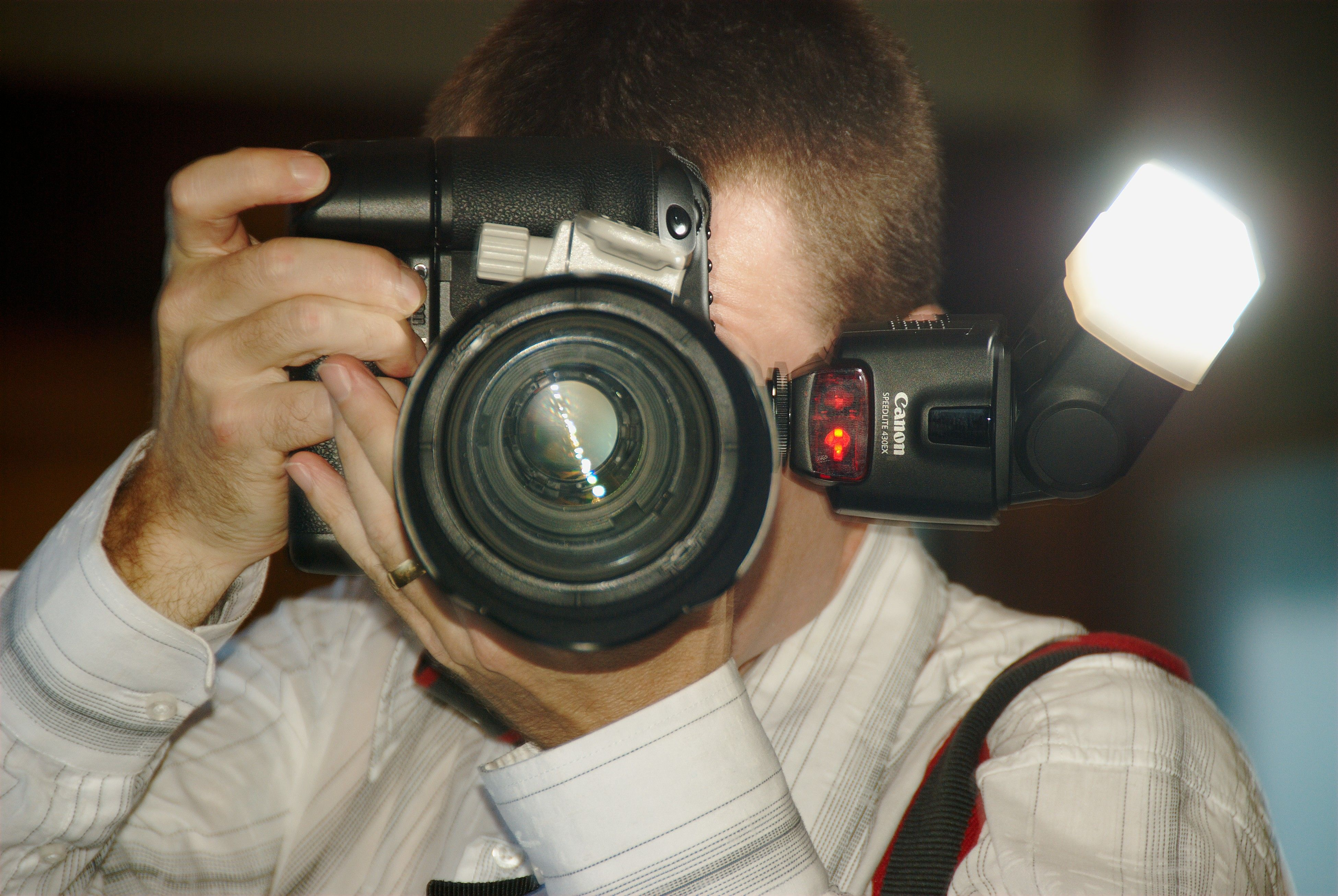
It's the job of a tracker to record and report back any slip-up by the rival candidate

The term first entered popular culture in the 2006 George Allen incident when a tracker recorded the incumbent Virginia senator using a racial slur, which contributed to his failure to win re-election. But trackers were being used in 2002 when Phil Press, one of the earliest ones, followed Pennsylvania gubernatorial candidate Ed Rendell and videotaped him falling asleep during an African-American Chamber of Commerce event. While embarrassed by a story of his napping on the front page of a Pennsylvania newspaper, during Rendell's 2006 re-election bid, the campaign hired Press to train a team of trackers to follow Rendell's opponent.

Campaigns have developed different strategies in response to the growing prevalence of trackers. Some restrict access to public and private campaign events, while candidates themselves have had to become more disciplined, knowing they are being constantly monitored and recorded. Others embrace the tracker’s presence. During the 2021 New Jersey gubernatorial election, Republican nominee Jack Ciattarelli frequently acknowledged a tracker from Governor Phil Murphy’s campaign, during town halls—at times introducing him by name and joking with the audience about his presence as a symbol of transparency.

The group America Rising, founded in 2012, works for Republican campaigns to track Democratic candidates. In 2018, the Minnesota Post reported that American Bridge 21st Century, a liberal political action committee, had more than 40 trackers in the field.

In 2017, a tracker hired by American Bridge 21st Century, trespassed to enter a private country club to record a speech given by state senator and gubernatorial candidate Scott Wagner. Wagner confronted the tracker, announcing, "You're about to see your senator in action" before grabbing the tracker's camera equipment and smacking the cell phone held near his face. The attorney general's office declined to prosecute either man.

NPR reported that in 2018, video or audio recordings had influenced six congressional and gubernatorial races in four U.S. states, as well as local contests.

In 2024, the Bernie Moreno campaign admitted using anti-recording technology to deter the efforts of trackers at its campaign events.
