= Jim Webb =

American politician, military officer and author (born 1946)

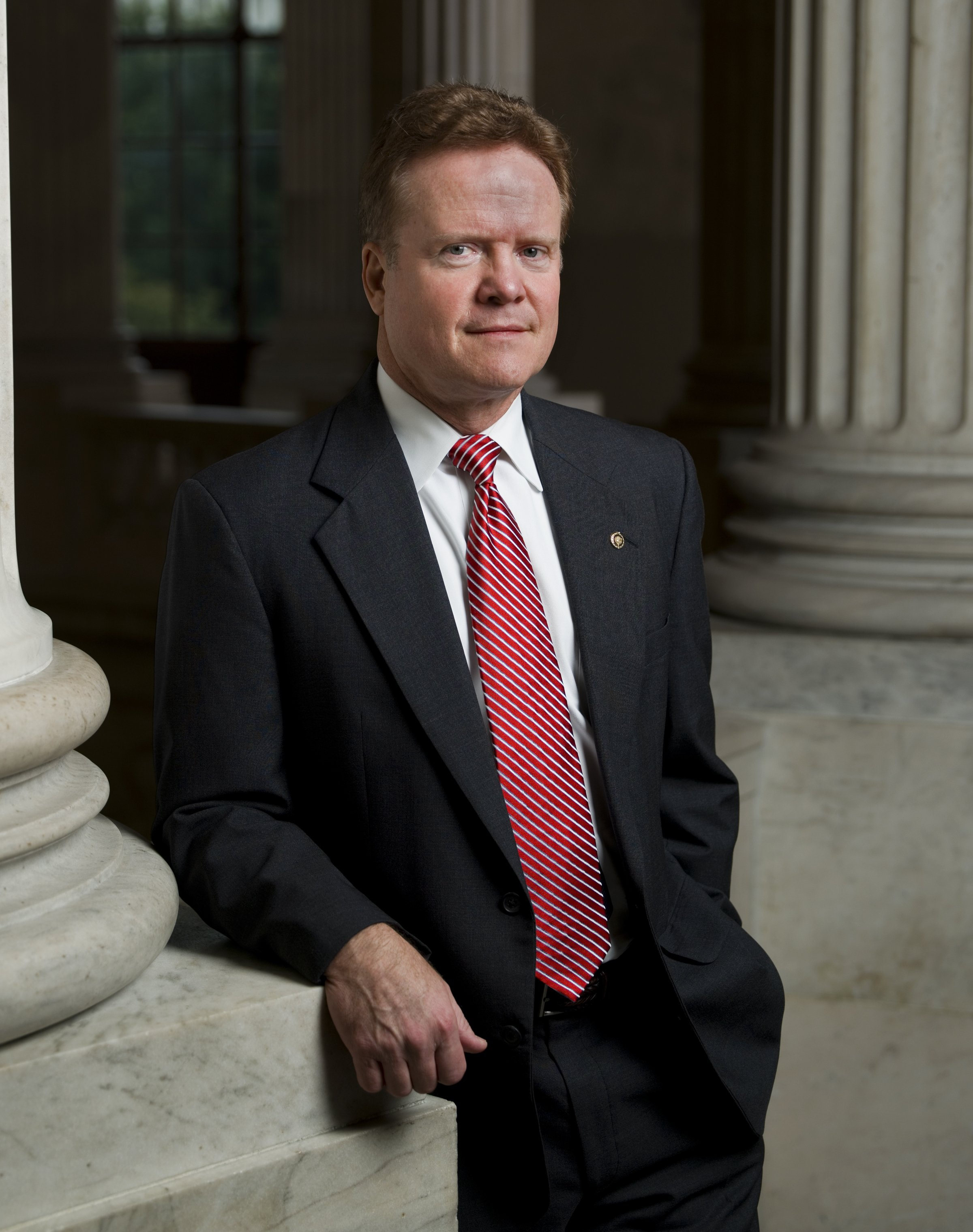
- Official portrait, 2007

United States Senator from Virginia
- In office January 3, 2007 – January 3, 2013
- Preceded by: George Allen
- Succeeded by: Tim Kaine

66th United States Secretary of the Navy
- In office May 1, 1987 – February 23, 1988
- President: Ronald Reagan
- Preceded by: John Lehman
- Succeeded by: William Ball

1st Assistant Secretary of Defense for Reserve Affairs
- In office May 3, 1984 – April 10, 1987
- President: Ronald Reagan
- Preceded by: Position established
- Succeeded by: Stephen Duncan

Personal details
- Born: James Henry Webb Jr. February 9, 1946 (age 80) St. Joseph, Missouri, U.S.
- Party: Republican (before 2006); Democratic (2006–present)
- Spouses: Barbara Samorajczyk (m. 1968; div. 1979); Jo Ann Krukar (m. 1981; div. 2004); Hong Le Webb (m. 2005)
- Children: 6, including 1 stepchild
- Education: University of Southern California (attended); United States Naval Academy (BS); Georgetown University (JD)
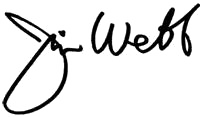
- Signature
- Website: Official website

Military service
- Branch/service: United States Marine Corps
- Years of service: 1968–1972
- Rank: Captain
- Unit: Delta Company, 1st Battalion 5th Marines
- Battles/wars: Vietnam War (WIA)
- Awards: Navy Cross; Silver Star; Bronze Star Medal (2); Purple Heart (2)
- Webb's voice Webb questioning James L. Jones, former National Security Advisor, on U.S. strategic interests in Pakistan. Recorded May 17, 2011

James Henry Webb Jr. (born February 9, 1946) is an American politician and author who served as a United States senator from Virginia from 2007 to 2013. He previously served as secretary of the Navy, assistant secretary of defense for reserve affairs, counsel for the United States House Committee on Veterans' Affairs and is a retired Marine Corps officer. Webb has been a member of the Democratic Party since 2006, having initially been a Republican. He was the first Democratic senator to be elected in Virginia since 1994 and is the most recently elected senator who did not serve as governor of Virginia.

Webb has also worked as a journalist and filmmaker, and is the author of ten books. In addition, he has taught literature at the United States Naval Academy and was a fellow at the Harvard Institute of Politics. As a member of the Democratic Party, Webb announced on November 19, 2014, that he was forming an exploratory committee to evaluate a run for president of the United States in 2016. On July 2, 2015, he announced that he would be joining the race for the Democratic nomination for president, but ended his campaign on October 20, 2015, stating that he was "not comfortable" with many political positions of the party's leadership.

In 2020, Webb was named the first distinguished fellow of University of Notre Dame's International Security Center.

== Early life and education ==
Webb was born in St. Joseph, Missouri, to James Henry Webb, and his wife, Vera Lorraine (Hodges). The second of four children and the older son, he grew up in a military family, moving frequently as his father's career in the United States Air Force required. The family crisscrossed the country, living in Missouri, Illinois, Texas, Alabama, Nebraska, California, and Virginia, as well as in England, where his father was an exchange officer with the Royal Air Force. His father flew B-17s and B-29s during World War II, and flew Air Force cargo aircraft during the 1948-49 Berlin airlift. After developing an inner ear disorder, Meniere's Disease, he became a pioneer in the Air Force missile program, later serving as the commanding officer of the 1001st Missile Squadron at Vandenberg Air Force Base. Webb's parents are buried at the Arlington National Cemetery.

Webb is descended from Scots-Irish immigrants from Ulster who emigrated in the mid-18th century to the British North American colonies. Webb's 2004 book Born Fighting: How the Scots-Irish Shaped America details his family history, noting that his ancestors fought in every major American war. A 2014 TV documentary on the Smithsonian Channel, also entitled Born Fighting, was adapted from Webb's book and is narrated by him.

Webb attended more than a dozen schools across the U.S. and in England. After graduating from high school in Bellevue, Nebraska, he attended the University of Southern California on a Naval Reserve Officers Training Corps scholarship from 1963 to 1964 and he also was a member of Delta Chi. In 1964, Webb earned appointment to the United States Naval Academy in Annapolis, Maryland. At Annapolis, Webb was a member of the Brigade Honor Committee and the Brigade Staff. When he graduated in 1968, he received the Superintendent's Letter for Outstanding Leadership. After his medical retirement from the Marine Corps due to injuries suffered in Vietnam, Webb enrolled in law school at Georgetown Law Center where he earned a Juris Doctor and received the Horan Award for excellence in legal writing.

== Military service ==
After graduating from the Naval Academy, Webb was commissioned as a second lieutenant in the U.S. Marine Corps. Attending the Marine Corps Officer Basic School shortly after leaving Annapolis, he graduated first in his class. He was promoted to first lieutenant in the second half of his tour in Vietnam. He served as a platoon commander with Delta Company, 1st Battalion 5th Marines. He was awarded the Navy Cross for heroism in Vietnam, the second-highest decoration in the Navy and Marine Corps. Webb also was awarded the Silver Star, two Bronze Stars, and two Purple Hearts. After returning from Vietnam, he was assigned to Marine Corps Base Quantico, Virginia, as an instructor for Officer Candidates School (OCS). He was then assigned to the Secretary of the Navy's office for the remainder of his active duty. His war wounds left him with shrapnel in his knee, kidney, and head. The injury to his knee led a medical board to recommend his medical retirement.

=== Awards and decorations ===
Known decorations and medals include:

Navy Cross	Silver Star	Bronze Star	Purple Heart
Achievement Medal	Combat Action Ribbon	National Defense Service Medal	Vietnam Campaign Medal

Webb received the Navy Cross for actions on July 10, 1969. The citation read:

The Navy Cross is presented to James H. Webb, Jr., First Lieutenant, U.S. Marine Corps, for extraordinary heroism while serving as a Platoon Commander with Company D, First Battalion, Fifth Marines, First Marine Division (Reinforced), Fleet Marine Force, in connection with combat operations against the enemy in the Republic of Vietnam. On July 10, 1969, while participating in a company-sized search and destroy operation deep in hostile territory, First Lieutenant Webb's platoon discovered a well-camouflaged bunker complex that appeared to be unoccupied. Deploying his men into defensive positions, First Lieutenant Webb was advancing to the first bunker when three enemy soldiers armed with hand grenades jumped out. Reacting instantly, he grabbed the closest man and, brandishing his .45 caliber pistol at the others, apprehended all three of the soldiers. Accompanied by one of his men, he then approached the second bunker and called for the enemy to surrender. When the hostile soldiers failed to answer him and threw a grenade that detonated dangerously close to him, First Lieutenant Webb detonated a claymore mine in the bunker aperture, accounting for two enemy casualties and disclosing the entrance to a tunnel. Despite the smoke and debris from the explosion and the possibility of enemy soldiers hiding in the tunnel, he then conducted a thorough search that yielded several items of equipment and numerous documents containing valuable intelligence data. Continuing the assault, he approached a third bunker and was preparing to fire into it when the enemy threw another grenade. Observing the grenade land dangerously close to his companion, First Lieutenant Webb simultaneously fired his weapon at the enemy, pushed the Marine away from the grenade, and shielded him from the explosion with his own body. Although sustaining painful fragmentation wounds from the explosion, he managed to throw a grenade into the aperture and completely destroy the remaining bunker. By his courage, aggressive leadership, and selfless devotion to duty, First Lieutenant Webb upheld the highest traditions of the Marine Corps and of the United States Naval Service.

His Silver Star citation read:

The President of the United States of America takes pleasure in presenting the Silver Star to First Lieutenant James Henry Webb, Jr. (MCSN: 0-106180), United States Marine Corps, for conspicuous gallantry and intrepidity in action while serving as a Platoon Commander with Company D, First Battalion, Fifth Marines, FIRST Marine Division in connection with combat operations against the enemy in the Republic of Vietnam. On 9 May 1969, during Operation Muskogee Meadow, a six-man reconnaissance patrol from First Lieutenant Webb's platoon was ambushed and temporarily pinned down by a large North Vietnamese Army force concealed in a tree line four hundred meters in front of Company D's night defensive position. Immediately upon learning of the dangerous situation, First Lieutenant Webb organized a reaction force and proceeded to the point of contact to aid his beleaguered Marines. When his reaction unit came under enemy automatic weapons and rocket fire as it approached the ambush site, he executed a skillful evasive maneuver, established a base of fire, and continued to advance across the fire-swept terrain to the patrol's position. Rallying and encouraging his men, he directed his base of fire forward to a more advantageous position and led his assault team one hundred and fifty meters across on an open rice paddy in a bold attempt to recover several casualties lying in an open area directly in the line of enemy fire. As his Marines delivered a heavy volume of fire at hostile positions, First Lieutenant Webb repeatedly exposed himself to enemy fire as he dashed into the open and pulled the casualties, one at a time, back to friendly lines. Then, consolidating his platoon, he initiated a sudden, vigorous attack which routed the enemy soldiers from their bunkers, disorganized their fire plan, and forced them to retreat from the area. His determination and bold fighting spirit inspired all who observed him and were instrumental in saving the lives of at least two Marines and undoubtedly thwarting the enemy's plan to launch a major attack against his unit's night position. By his leadership, extraordinary courage, and unflagging devotion to duty at great personal risk, First Lieutenant Webb upheld the highest traditions of the Marine Corps and of the United States Naval Service.

In 1980, Webb was interviewed for Vietnam: The Ten Thousand Day War, a Canadian television documentary about the Vietnam War. In one segment, he discussed how hard it was to adjust to arriving in Vietnam: "We stepped off an air conditioned plane, where I just watched a first-run movie, and you know, this German stewardess says, 'Have a nice war.'"

In the October 13, 2015, CNN Democratic Debate, when asked, "Which enemy are you most proud of?", Webb stated, "I'd have to say, the enemy soldier that threw the grenade that wounded me, but he's not around right now to talk to."

In a November 19, 2006 appearance on Meet the Press, Webb told host Tim Russert, "I'm one of these people who—there aren't many of us—who can still justify for you the reasons that we went into Vietnam, however screwed up the strategy got."

== Post-military career ==
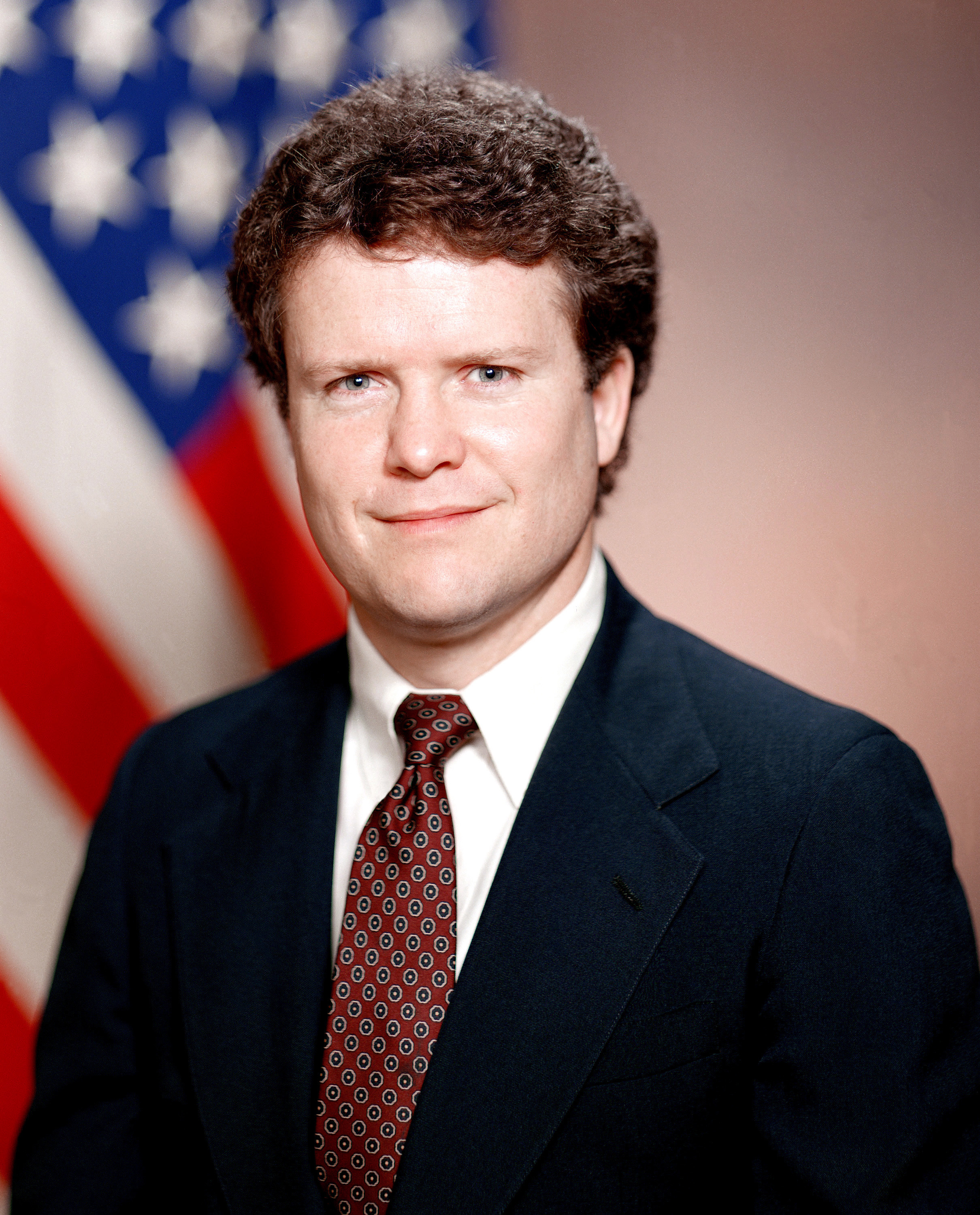
James Webb as Assistant Secretary of Defense, 1984.

Webb attended Georgetown Law Center from 1972 to 1975, graduating with a JD. While at Georgetown, he wrote his first book, Micronesia and U.S. Pacific Strategy.

From 1977 to 1981, Webb worked on the staff of the House Committee on Veterans' Affairs. During this time, he also represented veterans pro-bono. Webb taught at the Naval Academy and was criticized for a 1979 article published in Washingtonian magazine, titled "Women Can't Fight" (see "2006 Senate campaign" below). He attended the 1980 Republican National Convention in Detroit and led the Pledge of Allegiance in the opening session.

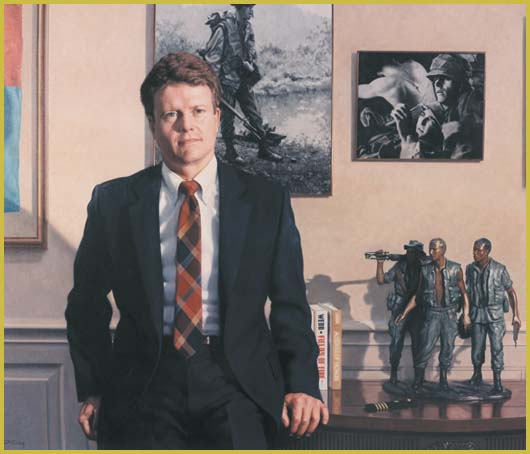
Portrait of Webb as secretary of the Navy

During the Reagan administration, Webb served as the nation's first assistant secretary of defense for reserve affairs from 1984 to 1987. In 1987, he served as secretary of the Navy, becoming the first Naval Academy graduate to serve as the civilian head of the Navy. As Navy secretary, Webb pushed the appointment of Alfred M. Gray, Jr. as commandant of the Marine Corps, hoping that Gray could reshape the Corps into the elite unit it once was. Webb resigned in 1988 after refusing to agree to reduce the size of the Navy. Webb had wished to increase the Navy to 600 ships. As revealed in The Reagan Diaries, President Ronald Reagan wrote on February 22, 1988: "I don't think Navy was sorry to see him go."

In a 1990 New York Times opinion piece, Webb opposed further U.S. military escalation in Saudi Arabia during Operation Desert Shield citing lack of a coherent strategy and consent from the United States Congress. He also warned against a permanent military presence in the Middle East.

Webb supported Nebraska Senator Bob Kerrey's campaign for the 1992 Democratic presidential nomination. In 1994, he endorsed incumbent Democrat Charles Robb for reelection to his Senate seat, over Webb's former Naval Academy classmate Oliver North; like Webb, both Robb and North were decorated Marine veterans of the Vietnam war. Webb subsequently endorsed Republican George Allen over Robb in 2000, and then ran against Allen himself in 2006.

Seven months before the beginning of the 2003 Iraq War, Webb wrote an essay for The Washington Post in which he questioned whether an overthrow of Saddam would: "actually increase our ability to win the war against international terrorism" and pointed out that the measure of military success can be preventing wars as well as fighting them. He charged, "those who are pushing for a unilateral war in Iraq know full well that there is no exit strategy if we invade." He concluded, "the Iraqis are a multiethnic people filled with competing factions who in many cases would view a U.S. occupation as infidels invading the cradle of Islam.... In Japan, American occupation forces quickly became 50,000 friends. In Iraq, they would quickly become 50,000 terrorist targets."

During the 2004 presidential campaign, Webb wrote an op-ed piece for USA Today in which he, as a military veteran, evaluated the candidacies of John Kerry and George W. Bush. He criticized Kerry for the nature of his opposition to the Vietnam War in the 1970s while affiliated with the Vietnam Veterans Against the War, and accused Bush of using his father's connections to avoid service in Vietnam. Webb wrote that Bush had "committed the greatest strategic blunder in modern memory" with the 2003 invasion of Iraq.

== United States Senate ==
=== 2006 Senate campaign ===
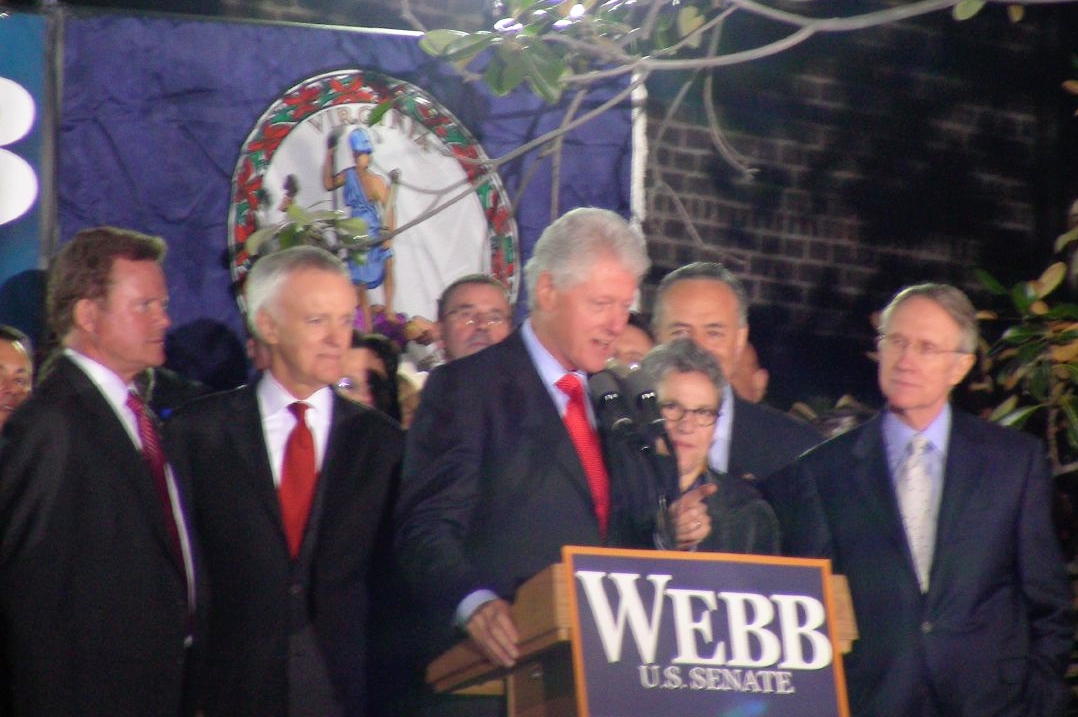
Former President Bill Clinton, Senate Minority Leader Harry Reid, Senator Chuck Schumer, and former Senator Bob Kerrey campaign for Jim Webb's bid for U.S. Senate

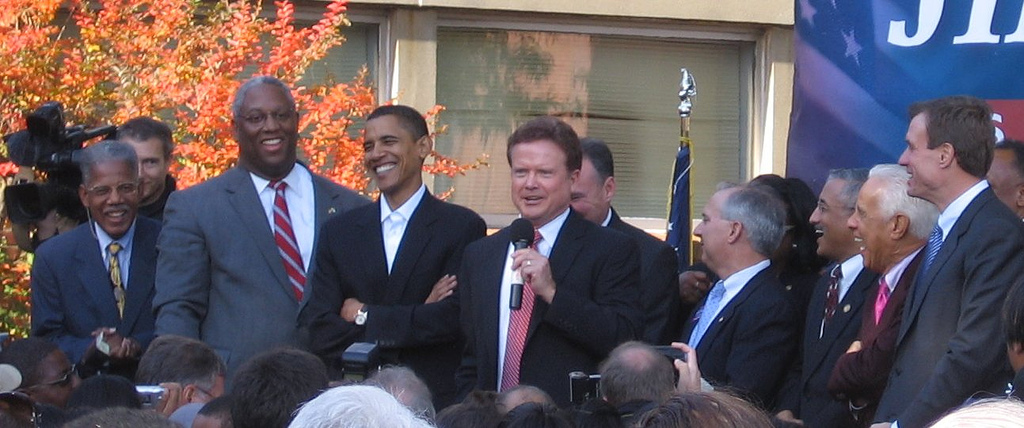
Then-Senator Barack Obama, former Governors Doug Wilder, Mark Warner, and then-Governor Tim Kaine campaign for Jim Webb

In late 2005, a campaign to draft Webb to run for the Senate in 2006 began on the internet, promoted by netroots activists such as those at the blog Raising Kaine. On February 7, 2006, he announced that he would seek the Democratic nomination for the 2006 Senate race against incumbent Virginia Senator George Allen.

In the Democratic primary on June 13, 2006, Webb faced longtime businessman and lobbyist Harris Miller. Webb won with 53.5% of the vote, in a race with low turnout.

On August 11, 2006, an incident occurred in which Allen used the word macaca to refer to Webb campaign associate S.R. Sidarth, who was filming an event as a "tracker" for the Webb campaign. A poll the following week showed Webb gaining ten percentage points. The race, which at one point looked like a sure win for Allen, became one of the most watched and closest races of the 2006 elections. Webb's entry into the race and primary victory changed the political landscape. Political analyst Larry Sabato said in May that "Jim Webb is George Allen's worst nightmare: a war hero and a Reagan appointee who holds moderate positions ... Allen tries to project a Reagan aura, but Webb already has it."

On September 7, 2006, Webb released his first television advertisement, which included footage of a 1985 speech by Ronald Reagan that praised Webb's service as a Marine. The next day, the Chief of Staff for the Reagan Library wrote to Webb's campaign on behalf of former first lady Nancy Reagan, urging them not to air the advertisement saying it was neither fair nor respectful because it gave the impression of an endorsement. The Webb campaign disagreed, saying, "What Reagan said about Jim Webb, that belongs to Jim Webb, frankly." The library said they ask all candidates to refrain from using the former president's image but declined to say if they would request the Allen campaign to remove the image of Reagan used on his campaign website.

Five female graduates of the United States Naval Academy held a press conference, decrying Webb's 1979 article, "Women Can't Fight." The women said Webb's article contributed to an atmosphere of hostility and harassment towards women at the academy. Webb was later endorsed by nine military women who stated that Webb is a "man of integrity" who "recognizes the crucial role that women have in the military today."

In October 2006, the Allen campaign issued a press release quoting several passages from Webb's novels with sexual content, including graphic references to female anatomy and purported pedophilia, homosexuality and incest, citing a passage in which a Southeast Asian father ritually places the penis of his young son in his mouth. The press release said that the passages showed a "continued pattern of demeaning women". Allen's campaign refused to tell a local radio news station, WTOP-FM, whether it in fact had issued a news release on the matter.

In response, Jim Webb explained to The Washington Post, "I actually saw this happen in a slum in Bangkok when I was there as a journalist." According to an article on Raw Story, the conservative website CNS News cited a case in Nevada in which a Cambodian mother was arrested for a similar act. According to the CNS article, an office manager for the Cambodian Association of America confirmed it is a cultural norm in Thailand and Cambodia.

On November 9, 2006, after AP and Reuters projected that Webb had won the seat, Allen conceded the election. Although the margin was narrow—less than half of 1% of the total vote and therefore small enough under Virginia law to allow demanding a recount—Allen stated that he would not challenge the result.

=== Senator-elect ===
On November 15, 2006, Senate majority-leader-in-waiting Harry Reid assigned Webb to three committees: the committees on Foreign Relations, Veterans' Affairs, and Armed Services.

"That same day, an op-ed authored by Webb appeared in the pages of The Wall Street Journal. Titled 'Class Struggle: American workers have a chance to be heard'. The piece addressed the harmful economic inequality in the U.S., with the elites on one side and American workers on the other side. The article cites the "age of globalization and outsourcing, and with a vast underground labor pool from illegal immigration", as well as extravagant executive compensation, the detrimental effects of free trade and globalization, iniquitous tax cuts, speedily rising health care costs, and stagnation in income as the reasons for the increasing disparity between the elites and American workers.

==== Exchange with President George W. Bush ====
On November 28, 2006, at a White House reception for those newly elected to Congress, Webb did not choose to wait in the line to have his picture taken with the president, whom Webb often criticized during the campaign. The president approached Webb later and asked him, "How's your boy?", referring to Webb's son, a Marine serving in Iraq. Webb replied "I'd like to get them out of Iraq, Mr. President." Bush responded, "That's not what I asked you. How's your boy?", Webb responded, "That's between me and my boy, Mr. President." The Hill cited an anonymous source who claimed that Webb was so angered by the exchange that he confessed he was tempted to "slug" the president. Webb later remarked in an interview, "I'm not particularly interested in having a picture of me and George W. Bush on my wall."

In response to the incident, some conservatives criticized Webb, including George Will, who called Webb a "boor" and wrote, "[Webb] already has become what Washington did not need another of, a subtraction from the city's civility and clear speaking." Others, such as conservative columnist and former Reagan speechwriter Peggy Noonan, reserved their criticism for Bush, writing: "I thought it had the sound of the rattling little aggressions of our day, but not on Mr. Webb's side."

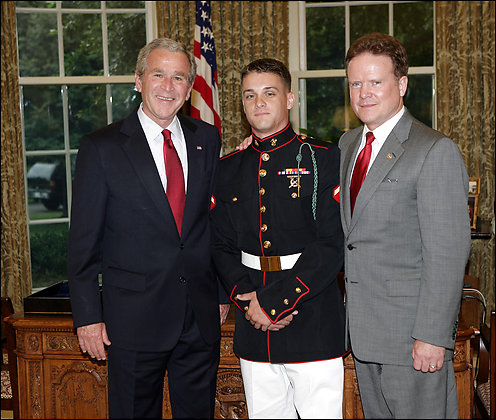
Jim Webb with son Jimmy and George W. Bush in March, 2008

Webb was asked about the exchange in a January 4, 2007 appearance on Hardball with Chris Matthews. He told Matthews:

My feeling about that – first of all, it's been kind of a bit overblown. But I think when people are now seeing how John McCain is handling the situation with his son being in the Marine Corps, perhaps they can understand a little bit more what I was having to go through during the entire campaign. I greatly respect my son's service and all of the people who are serving. At the same time, I have not commented, even to many of my friends, about the operational side. That's personal to me in terms of my feelings about it. And it was not a casual comment. As I said in the piece that you just ran, I think the best article that was written on that was by Peggy Noonan in The Wall Street Journal when she basically said that the lack of civility was not mine and I feel that way.

After his son returned from Iraq, Webb "buried the hatchet" with the president by setting up a private chat with his son, the president, and himself in the Oval Office.

=== Tenure as senator ===
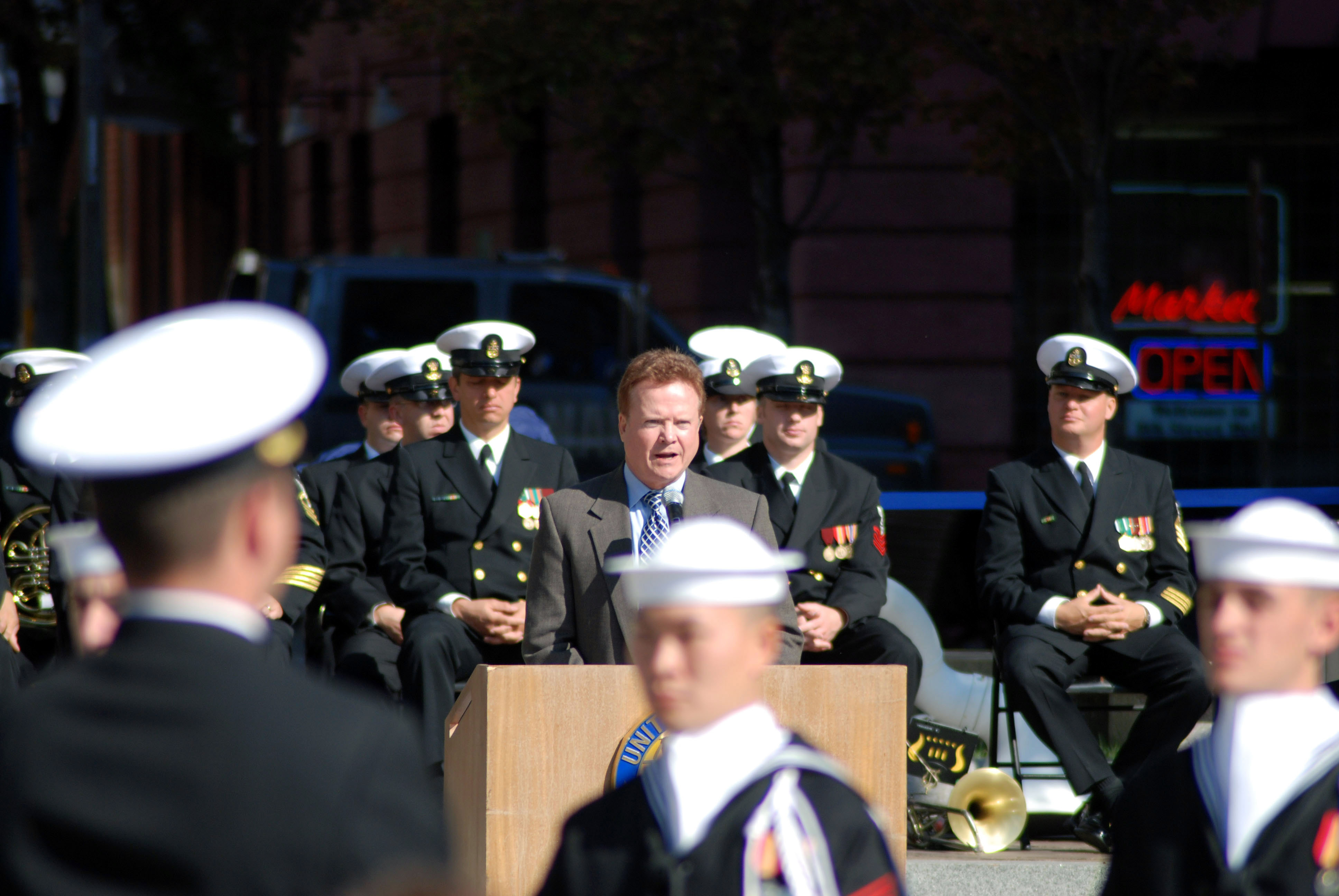
Senator and former Secretary of the Navy Jim Webb delivers remarks during the Navy Day celebration held at the U.S. Navy Memorial

On January 3, 2007, Webb was sworn into the 110th U.S. Senate, accompanied by Sen. John Warner, R-Va., a fellow former Secretary of the Navy; and former Virginia Democratic Governor. Chuck Robb, who held the same seat before losing to Allen. On his first day in the Senate, Webb introduced the Post-9/11 Veterans Educational Assistance Act, to expand benefits for military families, which he had written. The act replaces key provisions of the Montgomery G.I. Bill for recent veterans and "makes veterans benefits identical to those soldiers received following World War II". "With many of our military members serving two or three tours of duty in Iraq and Afghanistan, it is past time to enact a new veterans' education program modeled on the World War II era G.I. bill. This is exactly what our legislation does", Webb said. It became law on June 30, 2008, as part of the Supplemental Appropriations Act of 2008.

In a January 4, 2007, appearance on The Situation Room, Webb articulated his position on the Iraq War:

What we really need to do is to get into the arena where we can talk about a strategy, talk about the pluses and the minuses of the Baker-Hamilton Commission and work toward a solution that, on the one hand, will allow us to remove our combat troops, but on the other, will increase the stability of the region, allow us to continue to fight against international terrorism and allow us, as a nation, to address our strategic interests around the world. And this is—this is one of the drawbacks that we've had with so many troops having been put into this constant rotational basis inside one country when we have a war against international terrorism that's global.

Asked by Wolf Blitzer if he would ever support the efforts of Dennis Kucinich to cut funding for the war, Webb said,

I—you know, I lived through Vietnam. I lived through it as a Marine and I know that those sorts of approaches, while they seem attractive on one level are really not that realistic. What we want to do—and I was talking with a number of senators today—is to try to get some of these so-called emergency legislation packages back into the committee process so that the committees can actually play.

On January 23, 2007, Webb delivered the Democratic response to the president's State of the Union address, focusing on the economy and Iraq. Webb's speech drew positive reviews, and was regarded as one of the stronger State of the Union responses in recent memory.

On March 5, 2007, Webb introduced his second piece of legislation, S. 759, intended to prohibit the use of funds for military operations in Iran without the prior approval of Congress. In a statement on the floor of the Senate, Webb said, "The major function of this legislation is to prevent this Administration from commencing unprovoked military activities against Iran without the approval of the Congress. The legislation accomplishes this goal through the proper constitutional process of prohibiting all funding for such an endeavor."

On March 26, 2007, a senatorial aide of Webb, Phillip Thompson, was arrested for carrying Webb's loaded pistol as he entered the Russell Senate Office Building and for carrying unregistered ammunition. The weapon was discovered when Thompson went through an X-ray machine with a briefcase that contained a loaded pistol and two additional loaded magazines. Charges against the aide were dismissed after prosecutors concluded it could not be proved beyond a reasonable doubt that Thompson was aware that the gun and ammunition were in the briefcase. Webb responded to his aide's arrest by reiterating his support for gun-owners' rights:

I'm a strong supporter of the Second Amendment; I have had a permit to carry a weapon in Virginia for a long time; I believe that it's important; it's important to me personally and to a lot of people in the situation that I'm in to be able to defend myself and my family.

==== 2009 visit to Southeast Asia ====
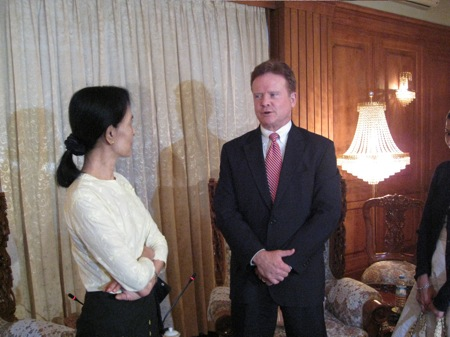
Jim Webb with Aung San Suu Kyi

On August 14, 2009, Webb visited Myanmar (Burma), seeing its junta's leader, Gen. Than Shwe, and also the pro-democracy leader Aung San Suu Kyi, who was under house arrest. During Webb's visit with Than Shwe, Webb negotiated the release and deportation of an imprisoned American, John Yettaw. Upon his return to the U.S., Webb wrote an editorial titled "We Can't Afford to Ignore Myanmar" for The New York Times, arguing for the easing of sanctions on the country. Webb stated that sanctions have isolated the country, thereby encouraging the ruling regime to turn to China and allowing "China to dramatically increase its economic and political influence in Myanmar, furthering a dangerous strategic imbalance in the region." Webb also noted that, unlike Myanmar, China does not allow opposition parties. Webb has stated that he started the pivot to Asia during the Bush Administration.

Webb visited Vietnam as part of a two-week trip to five Southeast Asian countries. Webb, who can speak Vietnamese, has had a continuous involvement in Asian and Pacific affairs that long predates his time in the Senate. In addition to his more recent visits as a member of the Senate Foreign Relations Committee, Webb has worked and traveled throughout this vast region, from Micronesia to Burma, for nearly four decades, as a Marine Corps officer, a defense planner, a journalist, a novelist, a Department of Defense executive, and as a business consultant. He worked in the 1990s as a consultant for companies attempting to do business in Vietnam.

==== Criminal Justice Commission Act of 2009 ====
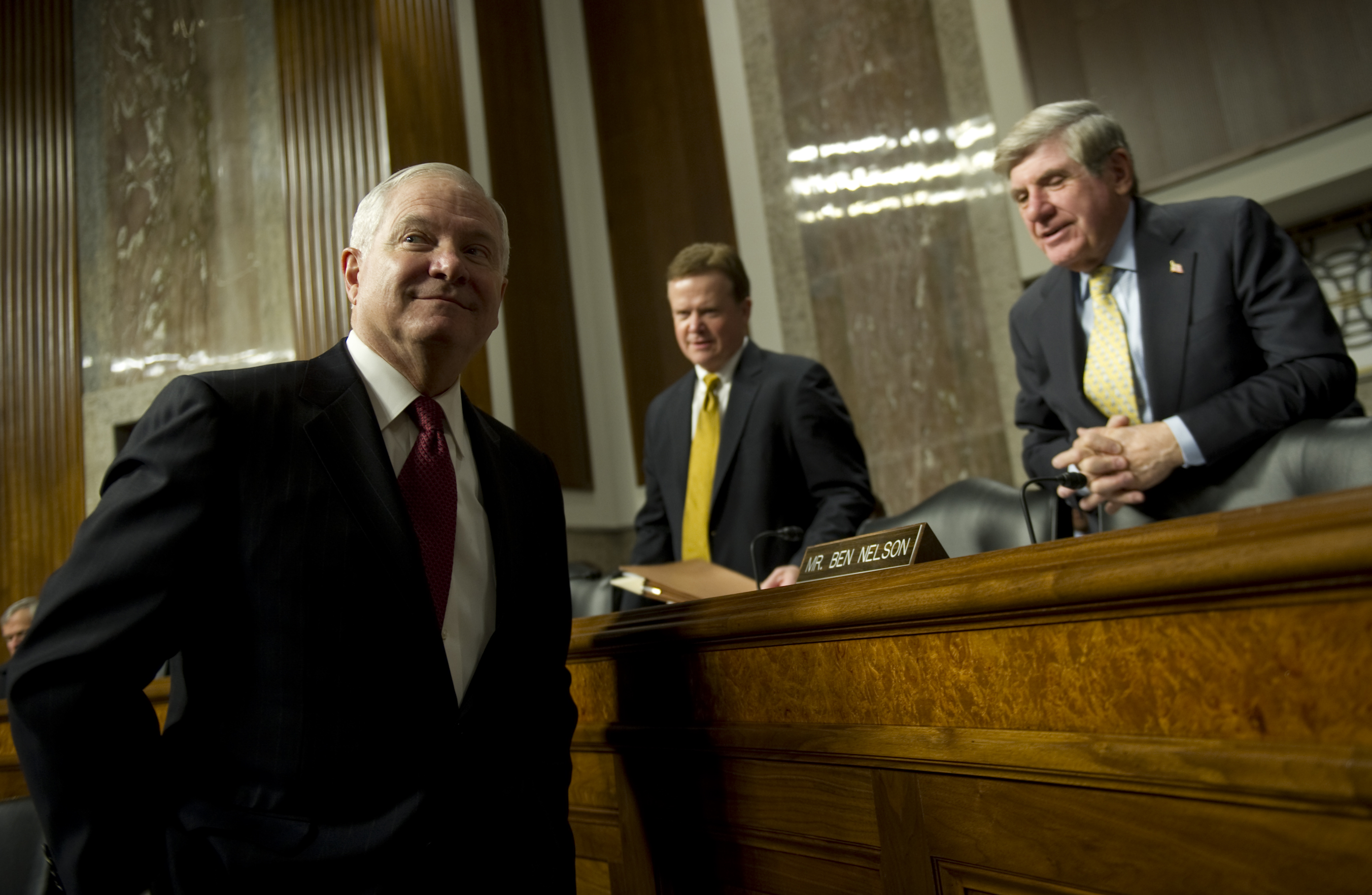
Defense Secretary Robert M. Gates and Senators Ben Nelson and Jim Webb prior to a hearing

On March 26, 2009, Webb filed the Criminal Justice Commission Act of 2009 (SB 714), which would create a blue ribbon commission to reevaluate the criminal justice system and drug policy and make recommendations for reform. Noting that the United States housed a quarter of the world's inmates despite having only 5% of the world's population, Webb proposed a comparison between U.S. incarceration policies and those of other developed nations. At a United States Senate Judiciary Subcommittee on Crime and Drugs hearing, Webb described the criminal justice system as being in "profound, deeply corrosive crisis that we have largely been ignoring at our peril." He also criticized the lack of standards in prison administration and highlighted the justice system's negative impact on communities. The subcommittee chairman, Sen. Arlen Specter (D-PA), expressed support for the bill at the hearing and indicated his intent to move the bill to the full United States Senate Committee on the Judiciary. By the end of June 2010, the bill had 39 cosponsors.

In the fall of 2009, an amendment to SB 714 was proposed by Sen. Charles Grassley (R-IA) that would have prohibited the commission created by the bill from discussing or recommending the decriminalization or legalization of any substance prohibited under the Controlled Substances Act. The proposed amendment drew criticism from some in the online community. Grassley later rescinded the amendment and claimed in a Des Moines Register op-ed that he had proposed it to "start a debate on this important issue". SB 714 passed the Senate Judiciary Committee by a voice vote on January 21, 2010, but no further action was ever taken.

==== Retirement from the U.S. Senate ====
On February 9, 2011, Webb announced that he would not run for re-election in 2012.

=== Committee assignments ===
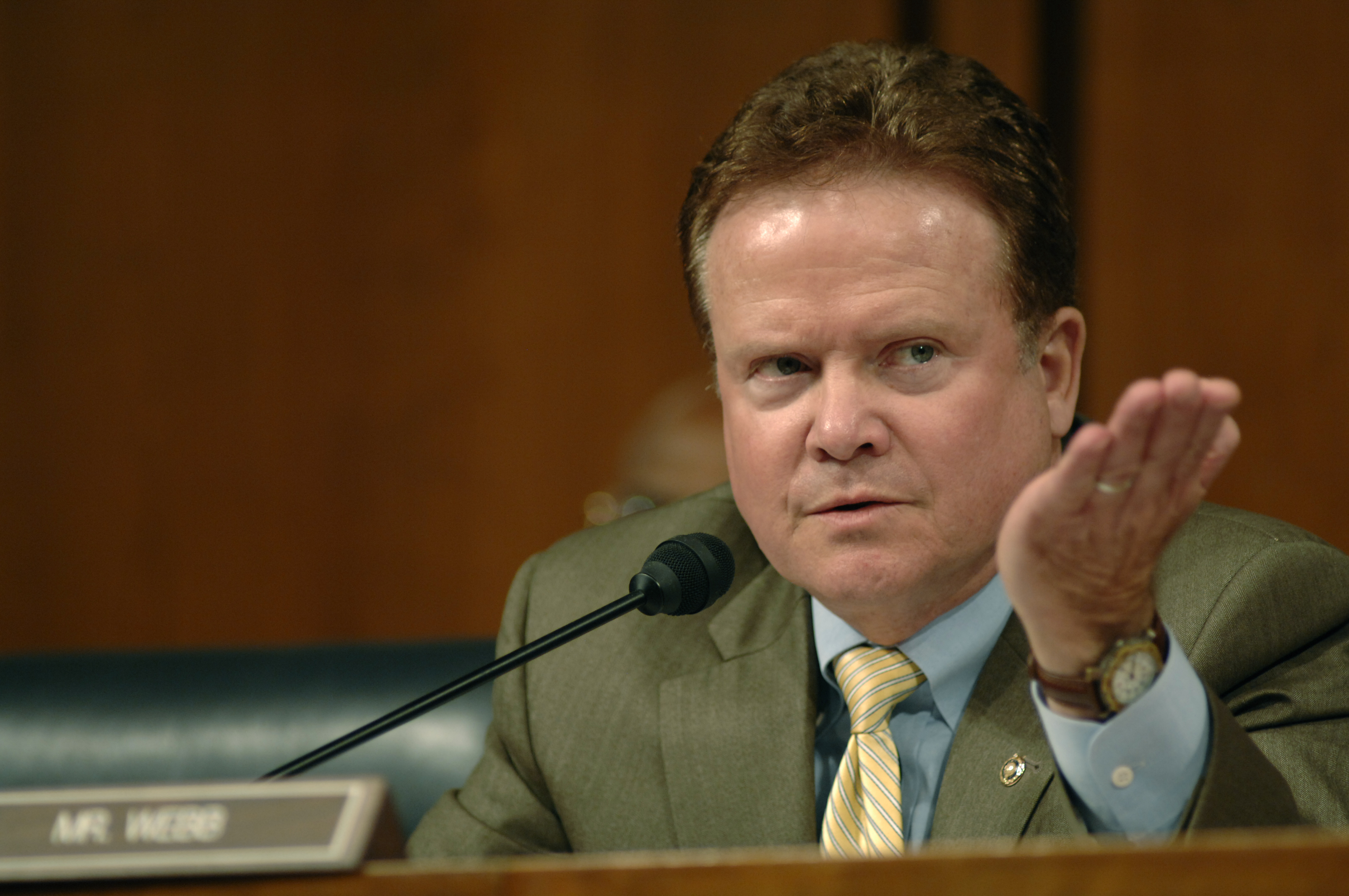
Senator Webb questions in the Committee on Armed Services

- Committee on Armed Services
  - Subcommittee on Airland
  - Subcommittee on Personnel (chairman)
  - Subcommittee on SeaPower
- Committee on Foreign Relations
  - Subcommittee on Western Hemisphere, Peace Corps and Narcotics Affairs
  - Subcommittee on African Affairs
  - Subcommittee on East Asian and Pacific Affairs (chairman)
  - Subcommittee on European Affairs
- Committee on Veterans' Affairs
- Joint Economic Committee

== 2008 vice presidential speculation ==
Webb was frequently mentioned as a possible vice presidential Democratic nominee for Barack Obama in 2008 due to his military experience and moderate policy positions. Although he said he was not interested in the vice presidency, speculations about his being picked by Obama, the presumptive Democratic nominee at the time, were still heard.

On July 7, Webb effectively removed himself as a possible candidate for vice president in a statement made to Time, stating that he intended to serve his term in the Senate and "under no circumstances will I be a candidate for Vice President." Obama went on to choose fellow senator Joe Biden as his running mate.

== 2016 presidential campaign ==

On November 19, 2014, Webb announced the formation of an exploratory committee in preparation for a possible bid for the Democratic Party's nomination for President of the United States in 2016. He made the announcement via a video posted on his website, as well as on YouTube.

On June 15, 2015, Webb announced he would make a decision regarding a presidential bid by the end of the month. Webb made a formal announcement on July 2, 2015, through an open letter on his webb2016 website, that he would seek the Democratic Party's nomination for the presidency.

On October 20, 2015, after failing to gain substantial support for his campaign ahead of the primaries, Webb announced that he would be dropping out of the Democratic presidential race in favor of a possible independent presidential run citing his "frustration with party leadership". On February 11, 2016, he ruled out making an independent presidential bid.

On March 4, 2016, Webb stated that he would not vote for Hillary Clinton in the 2016 presidential election and declined to rule out voting for Donald Trump.

== As an author ==
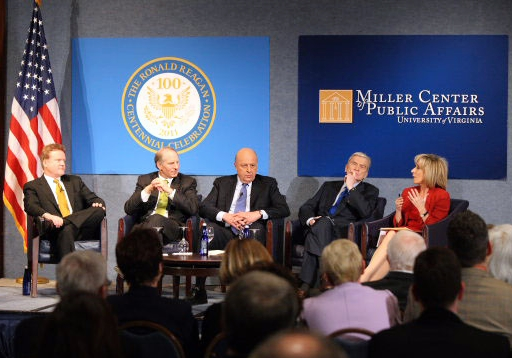
Senator Jim Webb, Council on Foreign Relations president Richard N. Haass, former deputy secretary of state John Negroponte, former Senator John Warner, and journalist Andrea Mitchell at Ronald Reagan Centennial Roundtable in 2011

=== Books ===
Webb's successful first novel, Fields of Fire (1978), drawn from personal experience, tells the story of a platoon of United States Marines in late 1960s Vietnam. Reviewers hailed its descriptions of infantry life and combat.

After five more novels, he wrote Born Fighting: How the Scots-Irish Shaped America (2004), a personal view of Scots-Irish and their place in American history and culture.

==== Works ====
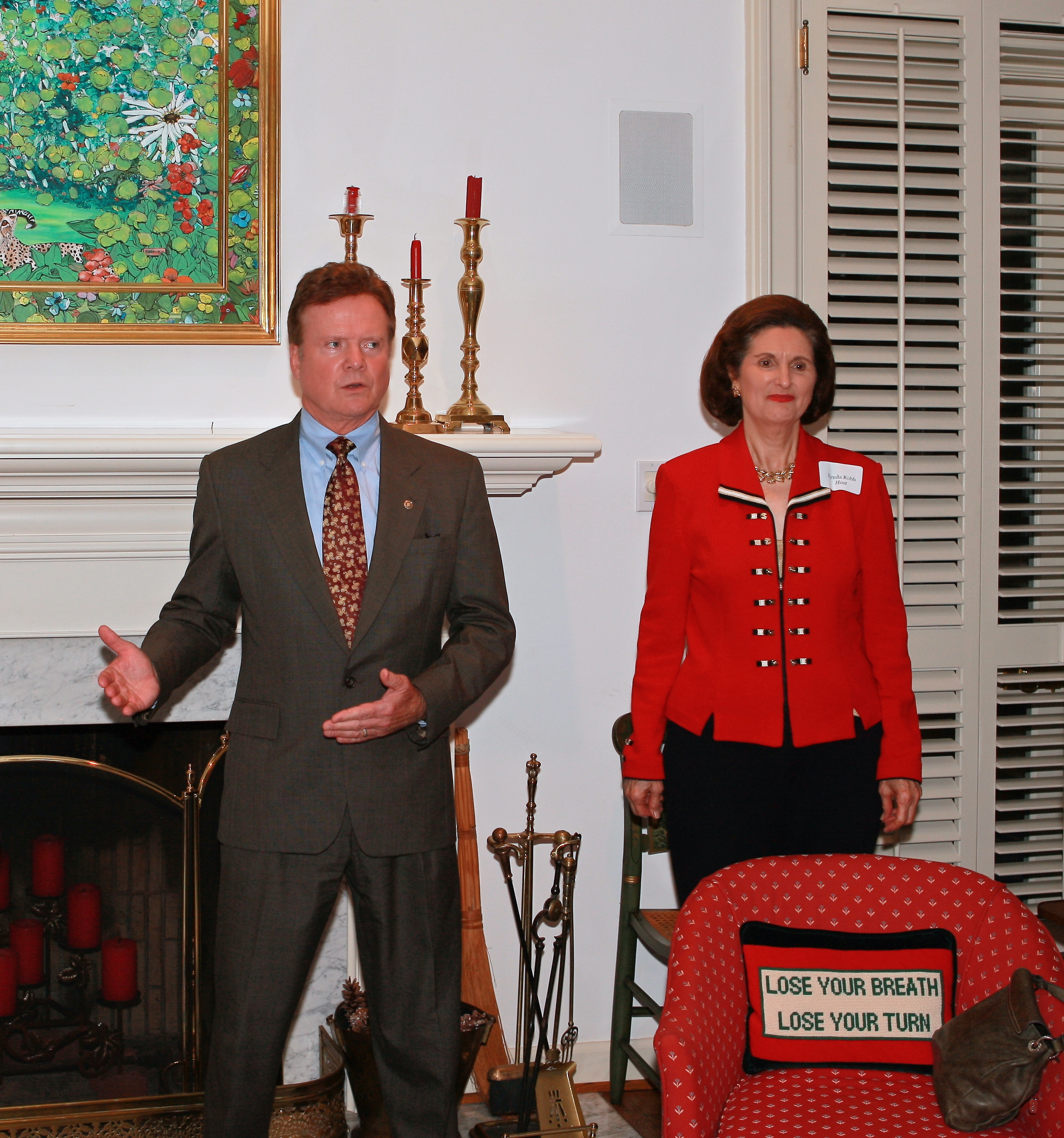
Senator Jim Webb and Lynda Bird Johnson Robb, daughter of former U.S. President Lyndon B. Johnson and also former first lady of Virginia, wife of Chuck Robb

- Micronesia and United States Pacific Strategy: Blueprint for the 1980s (1975)
- Fields of Fire (1978) ISBN 0-553-58385-9
- A Sense of Honor (1981) ISBN 1-55750-917-4
- A Country Such as This (1983) ISBN 1-55750-964-6
- Something to Die For (1992) ISBN 0-380-71322-5
- The Emperor's General (1999) ISBN 0-553-57854-5
- Lost Soldiers (2002) ISBN 0-440-24091-3
- Born Fighting: How the Scots-Irish Shaped America (2004) ISBN 0-7679-1688-3
- A Time to Fight: Reclaiming a Fair and Just America (2008) ISBN 0-7679-2835-0
- I Heard My Country Calling: A Memoir (2015) ISBN 9781476741154

=== Movies ===
Webb wrote the story, and was the executive producer, for the 2000 film Rules of Engagement, which starred Tommy Lee Jones and Samuel L. Jackson.

Warner Brothers acquired Webb's script for Whiskey River with Rob Reiner attached to direct and produce the film, with John Patrick Shanley writing the script. The script concerns an American soldier who is injured in Iraq and returns to the United States. Before completing rehabilitation, he is called back to active duty. His father, in an attempt to save his son's life, kidnaps him.

In October 2006, while commenting on the need to break away from stereotypical movie villains, Webb stated, "[e]very movie needs a villain. Towel-heads and rednecks—of which I am one ... became the easy villains in so many movies out there."

=== Articles ===
Webb is a prolific writer and has written for many national journals including the Marine Corps Gazette, Proceedings of the United States Naval Institute, USA Today, The New York Times, The Washington Post, and The Wall Street Journal.

== Personal life ==
His first marriage was to Barbara Samorajczyk, a lawyer who has worked for various real estate and development companies in Washington, D.C., and Northern Virginia. She is a member of the Anne Arundel County, Maryland, Council. They have one daughter, Amy, who was eight when they divorced in 1979. Webb and Samorajczyk have three grandchildren.

His second marriage was to assistant secretary of veterans affairs and health-care lobbyist Jo Ann Krukar in 1981; in later years, long after their divorce, she also assisted in his 2006 Senate campaign. They have three children: Sarah, Jimmy, and Julia. Webb's son Jimmy was a rifleman and sergeant in the United States Marine Corps, and served a tour in Iraq with Weapons Company, 1st Battalion 6th Marines. In tribute to his son, Jimmy, and to "all the people sent into harm's way", Jim Webb wore his son's old combat boots every day during his 2006 Senate campaign.

Webb is currently married to Hong Le Webb, a Vietnamese-American securities and corporate lawyer for Murphy and McGonigle. Hong Le was born in South Vietnam and came to the United States when she was seven, after the fall of Saigon. She grew up in New Orleans, Louisiana. They married in October 2005. Hong Le and Jim Webb have one child together, Georgia LeAnh, born December 2006. Webb is also a stepfather to Hong Le's daughter from a previous marriage. Jim Webb speaks Vietnamese.

== Electoral history ==
2006 United States Senate election in Virginia
Party	Candidate	Votes	%	±%
Democratic	Jim Webb	1,175,606	49.6	+1.91%
Republican	George Allen (incumbent)	1,166,277	49.2	−3.05%
Independent Greens	Gail Parker	26,102	1.1	
Write-ins		2,460	0.1	
Majority		9,329	0.39%	−4.18%
Turnout		2,370,445		
Democratic gain from Republican		Swing		

Webb won election to the senate in 2006, defeating incumbent George Allen.

== See also ==
- Democratic Party presidential candidates, 2016

Political offices
Preceded by John Lehman	United States Secretary of the Navy; 1987–1988	Succeeded by William Ball
Party political offices
Preceded by Chuck Robb	Democratic nominee for U.S. Senator from Virginia (Class 1); 2006	Succeeded by Tim Kaine
Preceded by Tim Kaine	Response to the State of the Union address 2007	Succeeded by Kathleen Sebelius
U.S. Senate
Preceded by George Allen	U.S. Senator (Class 1) from Virginia; 2007–2013; Served alongside: John Warner, Mark Warner	Succeeded by Tim Kaine
U.S. order of precedence (ceremonial)
Preceded by George Allen as Former U.S. Senator	Order of precedence of the United States	Succeeded by John Edwards as Former U.S. Senator
