= Macaca (term) =

Ethnic slur

Macaca [mɐˈkakɐ] (feminine) and macaco [mɐˈkaku] (masculine) are the Portuguese words for "monkey" (compare English macaque). In Portugal and Portuguese-speaking countries, macaco (plural macacos) is used as a slur against either black people or Brazilians in general.

Similarly the word "macaque" was used as a racial slur by Belgians in their African colonies.

The word is sometimes similarly used in English as a slur for dark-skinned people, pronounced /məˈkɑːkə, -koʊ/ or /məˈkækə, -koʊ/.

== Etymology and usage ==
According to Robert Edgerton, in the Belgian Congo, colonial Europeans called sub-Saharan Africans macaques—implying that they had lived in the trees until the Europeans arrived. The term sale macaque (filthy monkey) was occasionally used as an insult. In the ceremony in 1960 in which Congo gained its independence from Belgium, Prime Minister Patrice Lumumba gave a speech accusing Belgian King Baudouin of presiding over "a regime of injustice, suppression, and exploitation" before ad-libbing at the end, Nous ne sommes plus vos macaques! (We are no longer your macaques!) Lumumba had previously been called a sale macaque by a Belgian woman.

In the Adventures of Tintin written by Belgian writer-artist Hergé, Captain Haddock uses the term macaque as an insult, along with other random terms. In a 1994 essay, literary scholar Patrick Colm Hogan discussed the racist symbolism surrounding the name Makak, the protagonist in Derek Walcott's 1967 play Dream on Monkey Mountain.

Journalist Taki Theodoracopulos referred to Bianca Jagger, who is of Nicaraguan origin, as macaca mulatta in 1996. Theodoracopulos has frequently used racial slurs in his published work. In fact Macaca mulatta is the scientific name for the rhesus monkey.

=== 1996 Olé incident ===
In 1996, during Olé's first year of life, the Argentinian national sports daily newspaper was the centre of a scandal.

After the Argentinian Olympic football team's qualification to the final of the 1996 Olympic Games, the newspaper published on Wednesday July 31, 1996 the headline "Let the macaques come", in reference to the remaining semifinal match played between the teams of Brazil and Nigeria. Due to the criticism received by the headline, the newspaper had to publish an apology, although it did not face any consequences.

=== 2006 George Allen incident ===
The failed re-election campaign of Republican U.S. Senator George Allen of Virginia generated much controversy after he used the word macaca in reference to a person of Indian ancestry. On 11 August 2006, at a campaign stop in Breaks, Virginia, near the Kentucky border, George Allen twice used the word macaca to refer to S. R. Sidarth, who was filming the event as a tracker for the opposing Jim Webb campaign.

This fellow here over here with the yellow shirt, Macaca, or whatever his name is. He's with my opponent.... Let's give a welcome to Macaca, here. Welcome to America and the real world of Virginia.

— George Allen

Sidarth is an Indian American and was born and raised in Fairfax County, Virginia. Even though Allen claimed that he made up the word and said that he did not understand its derogatory meaning, a media outcry erupted following his use of the term. After two weeks of negative publicity, Allen publicly apologized for his statement and asserted that he in no way intended those words to be offensive.

Relating to the Allen controversy, "macaca" was named the most politically incorrect word of 2006 by Global Language Monitor, a non-profit group that studies word usage. The word was also a finalist for the American Dialect Society "Word of the Year" that same year.

The term "Macacawitz", referring to the September 2006 discovery of Allen's Jewish heritage (specifically Tunisian Jewish), was coined by conservative pundit John Podhoretz as a headline for a post in the National Review blog "The Corner". A field organizer for Democratic Congressional candidate Al Weed resigned after she used the term in email to supporters of Weed.

The controversy created by Allen's use of the term contributed to his narrow loss to Webb.

== See also ==
- Monkey chanting
