= American Bridge 21st Century =

Political action committee

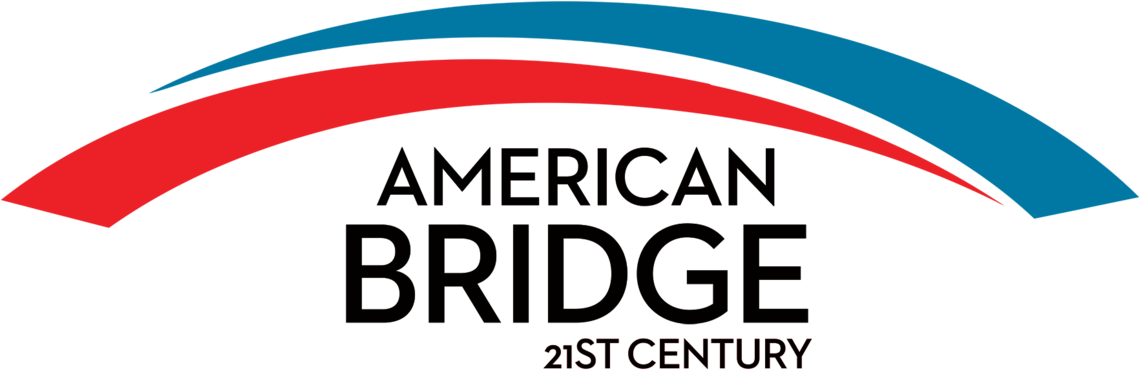
- Formation: November 2010
- Founder: David Brock
- Founded at: Washington, D.C.
- Type: Super PAC
- Methods: Opposition research
- Affiliations: Media Matters for America, The American Independent
- Revenue: $150 million (2024)
- Expenses: $100 million (2024)
- Website: americanbridgepac.org

American Bridge 21st Century or AB PAC is a liberal American super PAC and opposition research group that supports Democratic candidates and opposes Republican candidates. Founded by David Brock in 2010 and associated with Media Matters for America, the organization is one of the largest networks of liberal donors in the U.S.

American Bridge 21st Century is an opposition research hub for the Democratic Party. The group employs trackers to physically monitor and surveil Republican candidates and officials and uses social media to deploy its findings.

According to Politico, American Bridge 21st Century is "one of the largest and most public facing organizations affiliated with the Democratic Party." In 2020, the group spent $73 million, "making it one of the most prolific outside spenders on either side of the aisle." In 2024, the group expanded to target U.S. House candidates for the first time; it had previously focused only on presidential races, the U.S. Senate, and state races like governorships. American Bridge 21st Century spent $140 million on ads attacking Donald Trump in the 2024 election.

== Methods ==
In 2013, American Bridge PAC employed over 50 trackers to follow and record Republican candidates across the country. These trackers are equipped with high-tech recording gear and are assigned Republican targets to follow and record. According to The New York Times, the organization "aims to record every handshake, every utterance by Republican candidates ... looking for gotcha moments that could derail political ambitions or provide fodder for television advertisements by liberal groups." USA Today described the group's goal as "uncovering an unguarded moment, a controversial position, a gaffe or flip-flop, anything that can be used to torpedo a political foe's campaign." The organization compiles opposition research dossiers on the Republican candidates they are targeting. The group's opposition dossier on Mitt Romney was 2,500 pages long. It has attempted to tie Republican candidates to the political activities of the Koch brothers.

In 2016, American Bridge discovered that the Trump Institute's book was plagiarized, with at least 20 pages coming from a 1995 Success article. In 2018, it spent $20.9 million, mostly on employee salaries including the opposition researchers.

In January 2024, American Bridge 21st Century announced plans to spend $140 million on an anti-Donald Trump advertising campaign designed to appeal to working class women in the swing states of Pennsylvania, Michigan and Wisconsin. In May 2024, as part of this advertising campaign, the group spent $25 million on ads criticizing Trump on abortion policy.

After President Trump was elected a second time in November 2024, American Bridge 21st Century announced the launch of an opposition research and tracking effort focused on the incoming administration. They dubbed the project "MAGAFiles" and said it would focus on scrutinizing President Trump and his allies.

In February 2025, American Bridge 21st Century convened a focus group of voters who once identified as Democrats but who voted for Donald Trump. The voters said a "phony" and "corrupt" Democratic Party had "embraced far-left social crusades while overseeing a jump in inflation." The focus group was part of a $4.5 million research project designed to figure out what went wrong for Democrats in the 2024 election and how to win back former Democratic Party mainstays who have begun voting Republican. Former Democratic mayor of New Orleans Mitch Landrieu, former Democratic U.S. representative Colin Allred, and Democratic politician and advisor Tom Perez are involved with the project. American Bridge 21st Century also brought together a group of "despondent" and "adrift" donors from the "Democratic big-money universe" at a Florida donor summit to "try to figure out how the party can recover from Donald J. Trump's victory and extricate itself from the liberal malaise of his looming second term."

During the 2026 election cycle, American Bridge put large troves of its opposition research into Republicans online. According to Politico, the content "includes an AI-powered search tool that aims to bring together different sources about a candidate into cohesive messaging." Also in 2026, American Bridge spent $50 million, more than it had ever spent in a midterm election, on advertising campaigns targeting Republicans in traditionally Republican areas.

== Donors ==
American Bridge PAC is largely funded by wealthy Democratic donors, labor unions, and other PACs (Sixteen Thirty Fund/Arabella Advisors). The largest donors of the 2020 United States presidential election cycle include billionaire Stephen Mandel, Bain Capital co-founder Joshua Bekenstein, real estate titan George M. Marcus, and LinkedIn co-founder Reid Hoffman. In past election cycles billionaire George Soros and others helped the then fledging Super PAC in 2012.
