= Raising Kaine =

- Website type: Democratic/liberal/progressive blog
- Available in: English
- Creators: Lowell Feld and Eric Grim
- Website: www.raisingkaine.com (defunct)
- Current status: Defunct

Raising Kaine (RK) was a leading liberal political blog in Virginia. It functioned as a group blog and community forum for Virginia netroots activists, primarily directed toward helping to elect Democrats and other liberals and progressives in Virginia and nationally. The blog is now defunct.

RK was a popular example of a collaborative blog, offering comment and diary posting privileges to its visitors. Lowell Feld and Eric Grim founded it in January 2005, initially to help "raise" Democratic Lieutenant Governor Tim Kaine to the governorship in the 2005 Virginia gubernatorial election. (The term "raising Cain" is idiomatic for causing trouble.) RK also aimed to help elect other Democrats in Virginia, while promoting progressive causes and values.

At its peak, RK had an average monthly traffic of about 80,000–100,000 visits. As with many leading state and local blogs, RK ran on the SoapBlox software. The blog ceased operations in late 2008, but its content remained archived until 2011.

== History ==
Raising Kaine was founded in 2005, and supported Tim Kaine in the gubernatorial election against Republican Jerry Kilgore. Founder Lowell Feld has written that the blog was founded with the intent "to create a Daily Kos for Virginia." The blog continued to publish content until the end of 2008. Its posts were subsequently archived, where they were accessible until 2011.

== Content ==
Lowell Feld, Eric Grim, and a small group of selected users posted entries directly to the front page; other users could post "diaries," the titles of which appeared on the front page in reverse chronological order, with special attention and longer display time for those diaries highly recommended by other users. The other major source of content was the myriad comments posted in response to front page entries and diaries. Comments for popular or controversial diaries or front page threads could run into the thousands.

Front page entries and diaries often took the form of a news story from an outside source interspersed with commentary from the author of the diary or post. Sometimes these stories contained a request for action from other members of the community, such as to get involved with a particular campaign, give money to a candidate or contact an elected official about an issue. Some front page entries were called "open threads," which were open platforms for comments on any issue. One of the most popular versions of these open threads were "live threads" of commentary on important events happening in real time, such as debates or elections.

== Webb for Senate campaign ==
During the 2006 US election cycle, RK helped found the "Draft James Webb" movement, an effort to draft Marine Corps veteran Jim Webb to run for US Senate against George Allen. The movement was ultimately successful, with Webb declaring his candidacy, defeating businessman Harris Miller in the Democratic primary, and defeating Allen in the general election over the course of the year. Throughout the campaign, RK was a major proponent of Jim Webb's nomination and election. In July 2006, Lowell Feld and Josh Chernila were hired by the Webb campaign as netroots and volunteer coordinator, respectively.
