= List of American Samoa locations by per capita income =

This is a list of American Samoa locations by per capita income. In 2010 American Samoa had a per capita income of $6,311 — the lowest of any state or territory in the United States. In 2010 the median household income of American Samoa was $23,892, one of the lowest in the United States. In 2017, American Samoa had a poverty rate of 65% — the highest poverty rate of any state or territory in the United States.

== American Samoa counties ranked by per capita income ==
Note: American Samoa is divided into 14 “counties”, but these “counties” are not counted by the U.S. Census Bureau — instead, the U.S. Census Bureau counts American Samoa's 3 districts and 2 atolls as county-equivalents. See Administrative divisions of American Samoa for more information.

Data for this table is from American FactFinder (2010 U.S. Census).

Rank	County	Per capita income	Median household income
1	Swains Island	$9,586	$27,500
2	Western District	$6,429	$24,705
3	Eastern District	$6,191	$23,350
4	Manu'a District	$5,441	$17,614
5	Rose Atoll (Uninhabited)	$0	$0

== American Samoa villages ranked by per capita income ==
This is a list of American Samoa villages ranked by per capita income:

Rank	Village	Per capita income (2010)	Median household income (2010)
1	Anua	$34,322	$131,250
2	Avaio	$23,598	$33,750
3	Maloata	$13,996	$56,250
4	Alega	$10,972	$36,250
5	Swains Island / Taulaga	$9,586	$27,500
6	Amaua	$8,266	$31,250
7	Utulei	$8,194	$33,438
8	'Ili'ili	$8,182	$30,217
9	Matu'u	$7,854	$31,500
10	Tafuna	$7,695	$28,269
11	Faga'itua	$7,629	$32,500
12	Leloaloa	$7,602	$23,750
13	Leone	$7,549	$30,833
14	Fatumafuti	$7,524	$29,063
15	Utumea East	$7,507	$23,750
16	Faganeanea	$7,181	$32,500
17	Onenoa	$7,170	$38,750
18	Faga'alu	$7,168	$26,125
19	Auto	$6,998	$26,250
20	Atu'u	$6,810	$31,250
21	Tula	$6,742	$32,500
22	Faleasao	$6,714	$22,000
23	Ofu	$6,532	$18,438
24	Vaitogi	$6,490	$24,479
25	Utumea West	$6,441	$41,250
26	Pago Pago	$6,318	$22,128
27	Futiga	$6,244	$28,750
28	Nuʻuuli	$6,206	$21,643
29	Alao	$6,164	$28,542
30	Fagatogo	$6,147	$20,972
31	'Au'asi	$5,970	$36,250
32	Alofau	$5,856	$21,042
33	Vatia	$5,789	$29,063
34	Poloa	$5,779	$20,625
35	Masausi	$5,772	$21,875
36	Taputimu	$5,723	$22,000
37	Vailoatai	$5,704	$23,636
38	Luma	$5,665	$17,500
39	Mesepa	$5,657	$23,438
40	Lauli'i	$5,623	$24,375
41	Agugulu	$5,620	$19,375
42	Masefau	$5,612	$27,500
43	Olosega	$5,541	$12,500
44	Amouli	$5,528	$22,000
45	Fagamalo	$5,483	$23,750
46	Pava'ia'i	$5,482	$22,833
47	Amaluia	$5,414	$22,500
48	Aumi	$5,343	$27,500
49	Aua	$5,281	$18,824
50	Sa'ilele	$5,273	$26,250
51	Aoloau	$5,270	$24,167
52	Afono	$5,238	$29,063
53	Malaeimi	$5,205	$22,273
54	Fagasa	$5,148	$22,813
55	Fagali'i	$5,041	$23,750
56	Malaeloa/Aitulagi	$5,019	$21,458
57	Leusoali'i	$5,015	$19,063
58	Malaeloa/Ituau	$5,004	$20,714
59	Aunu'u	$4,764	$23,333
60	Mapusagafou	$4,759	$20,481
61	Se'etaga	$4,636	$27,083
62	Failolo	$4,505	$13,750
63	Nua	$4,447	$27,500
64	Faleniu	$4,393	$18,333
65	'Amanave	$4,391	$19,688
66	Afao	$4,309	$24,375
67	Maia	$4,289	$15,625
68	Aasu	$4,201	$20,000
69	Si'ufaga	$4,186	$12,000
70	Pagai	$4,068	$25,000
71	ʻAoa	$3,855	$16,875
72	Asili	$3,717	$19,375
73	Sili	$3,300	$16,250
74	Rose Atoll	$0	$0
