= Administrative divisions of American Samoa =

Districts and unorganized atolls of American Samoa
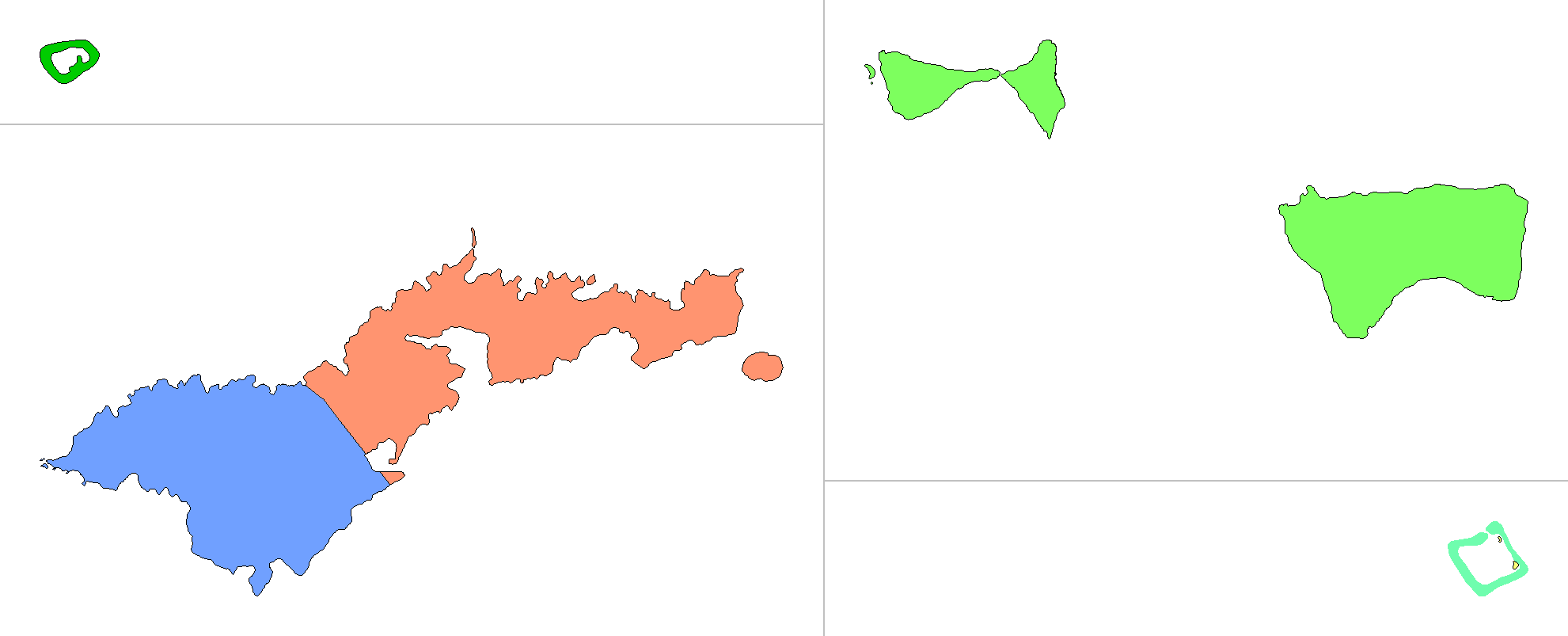
- Category: County equivalent
- Location: American Samoa
- Number: 3 districts 2 unorganized atolls
- Populations: 31,819 (Western District) – 0 (Rose Atoll, Swains Island)
- Areas: 27.99 sq mi (72.49 km^{2}) (Western District) – 0.03 sq mi (0.08 km^{2}) (Rose Atoll)
- Government: Local government
- Subdivisions: Counties and villages

American Samoa is administratively divided into three districts (Western, Eastern and Manuʻa) and two unorganized atolls (Swains Island and Rose Atoll). The districts are subdivided into 15 counties, (Note: An American Samoan law of 1962 defined 14 counties. The constitution of 1967, signed by delegates from these 14 counties, established 15 counties from then on, separating Fofo from Lealataua. The election law was later revised accordingly, and the government lists 15 counties, including Fofo with its own chief, representative and senator. The law defining the counties was not revised but the constitution overrides it where inconsistent. However, the U.S. Census Bureau continues to list 14 counties, treating Fofo as part of Lealataua.) which are composed of 76 villages.

For statistical purposes, the United States Census Bureau counts the three districts and two unorganized atolls as five county equivalents, while treating the actual counties as minor civil divisions.

American Samoa has only one U.S. ZIP Code: 96799.

The boundaries shown on the maps below are for Census Bureau statistical data collection and tabulation purposes only; their depiction and designation for statistical purposes does not constitute a determination of jurisdictional authority or rights of ownership or entitlement.

== Divisions ==
| Island/Atoll | District | County | Villages |
|---|---|---|---|
| Tutuila | Western | Lealataua | Fagamalo, Maloata, Fagaliʻi, Poloa, Amanave, Failolo, Agugulu, Utumea West, Seʻetaga, Nua, Afao, Asili, Amaluia |
| Tutuila | Western | Fofo | Leone, Auma, Puapua (Note: The part of Puapua east of Taputimu Road consists of lands that belong to Tualatai families and is part of that county. However, the U.S. Census Bureau includes all of Puapua in Lealataua County.) |
| Tutuila | Western | Leasina | Aasu, Aoloau, Malaeloa/Aitulagi |
| Tutuila | Western | Tualatai | Malaeloa/Ituau, Futiga, Taputimu, Vailoatai, Puapua |
| Tutuila | Western | Tualauta | Vaitogi, ʻIliʻili, Tafuna, (Note: The 2020 census listed Tafuna village with a land area of 2.36 sq mi (6.11 km^{2}) and all inhabitants in Tualauta county in the Western District, and an uninhabited land area of 0.12 sq mi (0.31 km^{2}) in Ituʻau county in the Eastern District.) Pavaʻiaʻi, Faleniu, Mapusagafou, Mesepa, Malaeimi, Nuʻuuli (Note: The 2020 census listed Nuʻuuli village with a land area of 2.22 sq mi (5.75 km^{2}) and 2,444 inhabitants in Ituʻau county in the Eastern District, and a land area of 0.72 sq mi (1.86 km^{2}) and 2,547 inhabitants in Tualauta county in the Western District.) |
| Tutuila | Eastern | Ituʻau | Fagasa, Nuʻuuli, Faganeanea, Matuʻu, Tafuna |
| Tutuila | Eastern | Maʻoputasi | Fatumafuti, Fagaʻlu, Utulei, Fagatogo, Pago Pago, Satala, Anua, Atuʻu, Leloaloa, Aua |
| Tutuila | Eastern | Vaifanua | Vatia, Alao, Tula, Onenoa, ʻAoa |
| Tutuila | Eastern | Sua | Saʻilele, Masausi, Masefau, Afono, Lauliʻi, Aumi, Alega, Avaio, Auto, Amaua, Utusia, Fagaʻitua, Pagai (Note: The 2020 census listed Pagai village with a land area of 0.04 sq mi (0.10 km^{2}) and 25 inhabitants in Sua county, and a land area of 0.11 sq mi (0.28 km^{2}) and 56 inhabitants in Saʻole county, all in the Eastern District.) |
| Tutuila | Eastern | Saʻole | Pagai, Alofau, Amouli, Auasi, Utumea East |
| Aunuʻu | Eastern | Saʻole | Aunuʻu |
| Ofu | Manuʻa | Ofu | Ofu |
| Olosega | Manuʻa | Olosega | Olosega, Sili |
| Taʻū | Manuʻa | Taʻū | Siʻufaga, Lumā |
| Taʻū | Manuʻa | Faleasao | Faleasao |
| Taʻū | Manuʻa | Fitiuta | Maia, Leusoaliʻi |
| Swains | — | — | Taulaga, Etena (abandoned) |
| Rose | — | — | — |

== Maps ==
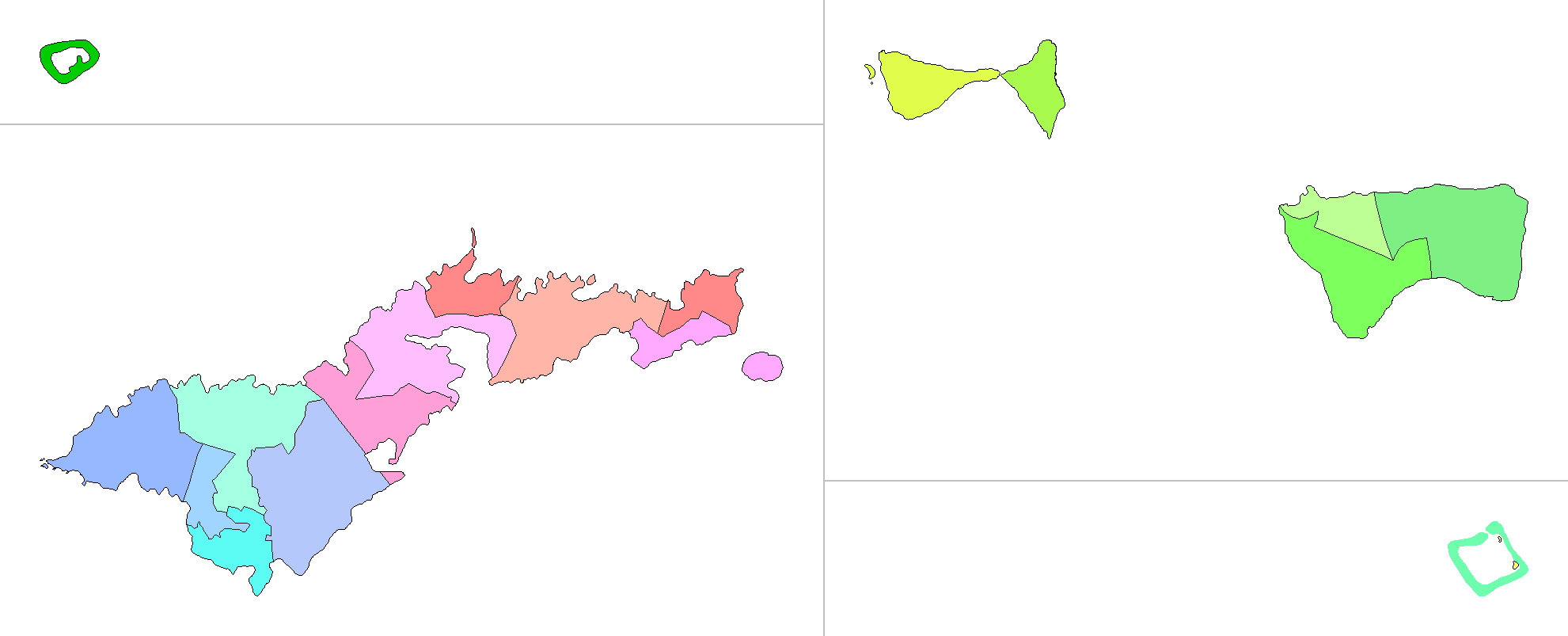
Counties of American Samoa

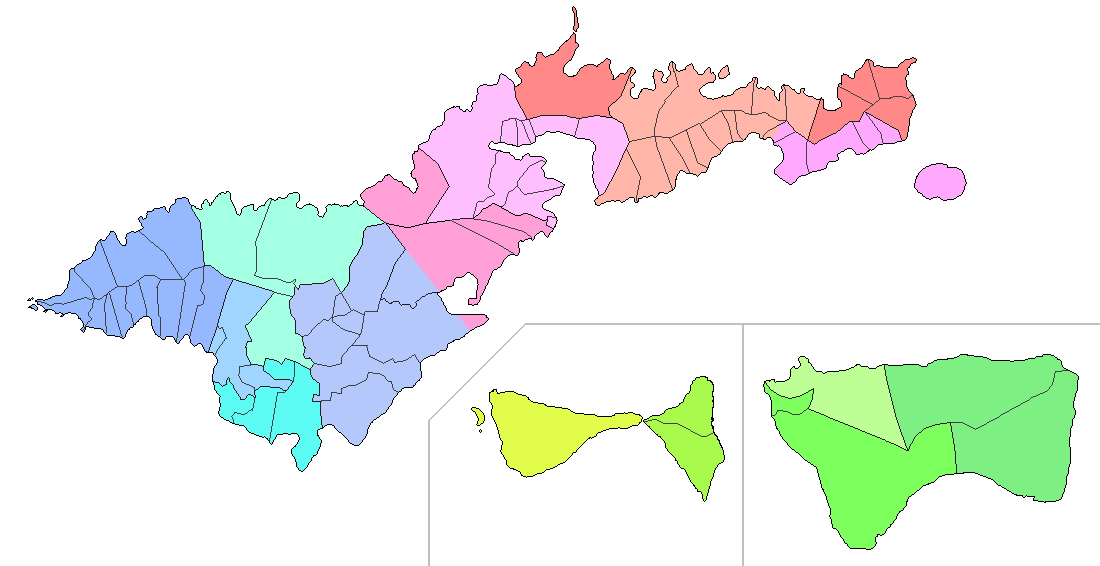
Villages of American Samoa

== Statistics ==
The numbers below are from the 2020 census.

| island/atoll | population | | land area | | |
| island/atoll | number | % | sq mi | km^{2} | % |
|---|---|---|---|---|---|
| Tutuila | 48,476 | 97.52% | 52.55 | 136.12 | 68.83% |
| Aunuʻu | 402 | 0.81% | 0.58 | 1.51 | 0.76% |
| Ofu | 132 | 0.27% | 2.82 | 7.31 | 3.70% |
| Olosega | 147 | 0.30% | 2.00 | 5.18 | 2.62% |
| Taʻū | 553 | 1.11% | 17.43 | 45.13 | 22.82% |
| Swains | 0 | 0.00% | 0.94 | 2.43 | 1.23% |
| Rose | 0 | 0.00% | 0.03 | 0.08 | 0.04% |
| American Samoa | 49,710 | 100.00% | 76.36 | 197.76 | 100.00% |

| district | population | | land area | | |
| district | number | % | sq mi | km^{2} | % |
|---|---|---|---|---|---|
| Western | 31,819 | 64.01% | 27.99 | 71.50 | 36.66% |
| Eastern | 17,059 | 34.32% | 25.14 | 65.12 | 32.93% |
| Manuʻa | 832 | 1.67% | 22.25 | 57.62 | 29.14% |

| county | population | | land area | | |
| county | number | % | sq mi | km^{2} | % |
|---|---|---|---|---|---|
| Lealataua (Note: The 2020 census treated Fofo as part of Lealataua. The numbers in this row are the sums of the villages of Lealataua without Fofo.) | 1,496 | 3.01% | 6.96 | 18.03 | 9.12% |
| Fofo (Note: The 2020 census treated Fofo as part of Lealataua. The numbers in this row are the sums of the villages of Fofo.) | 2,797 | 5.63% | 1.99 | 5.16 | 2.61% |
| Leasina | 1,689 | 3.40% | 7.22 | 18.71 | 9.46% |
| Tualatai | 3,010 | 6.06% | 2.59 | 6.71 | 3.39% |
| Tualauta | 22,827 | 45.92% | 9.22 | 23.88 | 12.08% |
| Ituʻau | 3,431 | 6.90% | 5.01 | 12.99 | 6.57% |
| Maʻoputasi | 8,568 | 17.24% | 6.61 | 17.11 | 8.65% |
| Vaifanua | 1,487 | 2.99% | 4.58 | 11.87 | 6.00% |
| Sua | 2,415 | 4.86% | 6.64 | 17.20 | 8.70% |
| Saʻole | 1,158 | 2.33% | 2.30 | 5.95 | 3.01% |
| Ofu | 132 | 0.27% | 2.82 | 7.31 | 3.70% |
| Olosega | 147 | 0.30% | 2.00 | 5.18 | 2.62% |
| Taʻū | 236 | 0.47% | 6.13 | 15.87 | 8.03% |
| Faleasao | 104 | 0.21% | 2.68 | 6.93 | 3.50% |
| Fitiuta | 213 | 0.43% | 8.62 | 22.33 | 11.29% |

| village | population | | land area | | |
| village | number | % | sq mi | km^{2} | % |
|---|---|---|---|---|---|
| Fagamalo | 37 | 0.07% | 1.39 | 3.60 | 1.82% |
| Maloata | 6 | 0.01% | 1.20 | 3.10 | 1.57% |
| Fagaliʻi | 163 | 0.33% | 0.60 | 1.55 | 0.78% |
| Poloa | 130 | 0.26% | 0.32 | 0.82 | 0.42% |
| ʻAmanave | 246 | 0.49% | 0.30 | 0.79 | 0.40% |
| Failolo | 87 | 0.18% | 0.25 | 0.64 | 0.32% |
| Agugulu | 42 | 0.08% | 0.15 | 0.40 | 0.20% |
| Utumea West | 42 | 0.08% | 0.26 | 0.67 | 0.34% |
| Seʻetaga | 177 | 0.36% | 0.27 | 0.70 | 0.35% |
| Nua | 150 | 0.30% | 0.37 | 0.96 | 0.48% |
| Afao | 96 | 0.19% | 0.54 | 1.41 | 0.71% |
| Asili | 157 | 0.32% | 0.54 | 1.39 | 0.70% |
| Amaluia | 163 | 0.33% | 0.78 | 2.01 | 1.02% |
| Leone | 1,598 | 3.21% | 1.49 | 3.86 | 1.95% |
| Auma | 242 | 0.49% | 0.13 | 0.33 | 0.17% |
| Puapua | 957 | 1.93% | 0.37 | 0.97 | 0.49% |
| Aasu | 425 | 0.85% | 3.59 | 9.31 | 4.71% |
| Aoloau | 650 | 1.31% | 2.24 | 5.81 | 2.94% |
| Malaeloa/Aitulagi | 614 | 1.24% | 1.39 | 3.59 | 1.82% |
| Malaeloa/Ituau | 424 | 0.85% | 0.23 | 0.61 | 0.31% |
| Futiga | 682 | 1.37% | 1.34 | 3.48 | 1.76% |
| Taputimu | 709 | 1.43% | 0.61 | 1.58 | 0.80% |
| Vailoatai | 1,195 | 2.40% | 0.40 | 1.04 | 0.53% |
| Vaitogi | 1,921 | 3.86% | 1.37 | 3.55 | 1.80% |
| ʻIliʻili | 3,073 | 6.18% | 1.39 | 3.59 | 1.82% |
| Tafuna | 7,988 | 16.07% | 2.48 | 6.42 | 3.25% |
| Pavaʻiaʻi | 2,112 | 4.25% | 0.73 | 1.90 | 0.96% |
| Faleniu | 1,953 | 3.93% | 0.25 | 0.64 | 0.32% |
| Mapusagafou | 1,772 | 3.56% | 0.80 | 2.06 | 1.04% |
| Mesepa | 415 | 0.83% | 0.11 | 0.28 | 0.14% |
| Malaeimi | 1,046 | 2.10% | 1.50 | 3.88 | 1.96% |
| Fagasa | 577 | 1.16% | 1.68 | 4.36 | 2.21% |
| Nuʻuuli | 4,991 | 10.04% | 2.94 | 7.62 | 3.85% |
| Faganeanea | 93 | 0.19% | 0.53 | 1.36 | 0.69% |
| Matuʻu | 317 | 0.64% | 0.46 | 1.20 | 0.61% |
| Fatumafuti | 72 | 0.14% | 0.04 | 0.10 | 0.05% |
| Fagaʻalu | 731 | 1.47% | 0.51 | 1.33 | 0.67% |
| Utulei | 479 | 0.96% | 0.33 | 0.86 | 0.44% |
| Fagatogo | 1,445 | 2.91% | 0.66 | 1.72 | 0.87% |
| Pago Pago | 3,000 | 6.04% | 3.43 | 8.88 | 4.49% |
| Satala | 218 | 0.44% | 0.15 | 0.40 | 0.20% |
| Anua | 473 | 0.95% | 0.07 | 0.18 | 0.09% |
| Atuʻu | 236 | 0.47% | 0.06 | 0.16 | 0.08% |
| Leloaloa | 365 | 0.73% | 0.34 | 0.87 | 0.44% |
| Aua | 1,549 | 3.12% | 1.01 | 2.61 | 1.32% |
| Vatia | 460 | 0.93% | 2.50 | 6.46 | 3.27% |
| Alao | 275 | 0.55% | 0.53 | 1.36 | 0.69% |
| Tula | 308 | 0.62% | 0.50 | 1.31 | 0.66% |
| Onenoa | 100 | 0.20% | 0.39 | 1.01 | 0.51% |
| ʻAoa | 344 | 0.69% | 0.67 | 1.72 | 0.87% |
| Saʻilele | 60 | 0.12% | 0.53 | 1.37 | 0.69% |
| Masausi | 134 | 0.27% | 0.37 | 0.95 | 0.48% |
| Masefau | 260 | 0.52% | 1.63 | 4.23 | 2.14% |
| Afono | 327 | 0.66% | 1.03 | 2.68 | 1.35% |
| Lauliʻi | 736 | 1.48% | 0.52 | 1.34 | 0.68% |
| Aumi | 176 | 0.35% | 0.70 | 1.82 | 0.92% |
| Alega | 29 | 0.06% | 0.39 | 1.01 | 0.51% |
| Avaio | 34 | 0.07% | 0.28 | 0.72 | 0.36% |
| Auto | 214 | 0.43% | 0.33 | 0.86 | 0.43% |
| Amaua | 68 | 0.14% | 0.31 | 0.80 | 0.40% |
| Utusia | 65 | 0.13% | 0.12 | 0.30 | 0.15% |
| Fagaʻitua | 287 | 0.58% | 0.39 | 1.02 | 0.52% |
| Pagai | 81 | 0.16% | 0.15 | 0.39 | 0.19% |
| Alofau | 296 | 0.60% | 0.50 | 1.30 | 0.66% |
| Amouli | 261 | 0.53% | 0.66 | 1.71 | 0.86% |
| Auasi | 88 | 0.18% | 0.26 | 0.66 | 0.34% |
| Utumea East | 55 | 0.11% | 0.19 | 0.49 | 0.25% |
| Aunuʻu | 402 | 0.81% | 0.58 | 1.51 | 0.76% |
| Ofu | 132 | 0.27% | 2.82 | 7.31 | 3.70% |
| Olosega | 138 | 0.28% | 1.21 | 3.13 | 1.58% |
| Sili | 9 | 0.02% | 0.79 | 2.04 | 1.03% |
| Siʻufaga | 110 | 0.22% | 5.77 | 14.93 | 7.55% |
| Luma | 126 | 0.25% | 0.36 | 0.94 | 0.48% |
| Faleasao | 104 | 0.21% | 2.68 | 6.93 | 3.50% |
| Maia | 120 | 0.24% | 4.39 | 11.36 | 5.75% |
| Leusoaliʻi | 93 | 0.19% | 4.23 | 10.97 | 5.54% |

== Local government structure ==
Amata Coleman Radewagen's congressional website said the following about American Samoa's districts:

Each [district] is administered by a district governor who is appointed by the territorial governor. To be qualified as a district governor, an individual must hold a matai title within the district to which he/she is to be appointed.

The U.S. National Park Service says the following about the structure of villages in American Samoa:

In general each village is made up of a group of aiga (extended families) which include as many relatives as can be claimed. Each aiga is headed by a matai (chief) who represents the family on all matters including the village council, or fono. Matais hold title to all assets of the aigas, or families, they represent and are responsible for law enforcement and punishment of infractions occurring in their villages. The fono consists of the matais of all the aiga associated with the village. The highest chief of the matais of all the village aigas is the highest chief or the aliʻi and heads the fono. Also, each village has a pulenuʻu (somewhat like a police chief or mayor) and one or more talking chiefs, tulafale."
