= Lealataua County =

County in American Samoa

Coordinates: 14°20′38″S 170°47′06″W

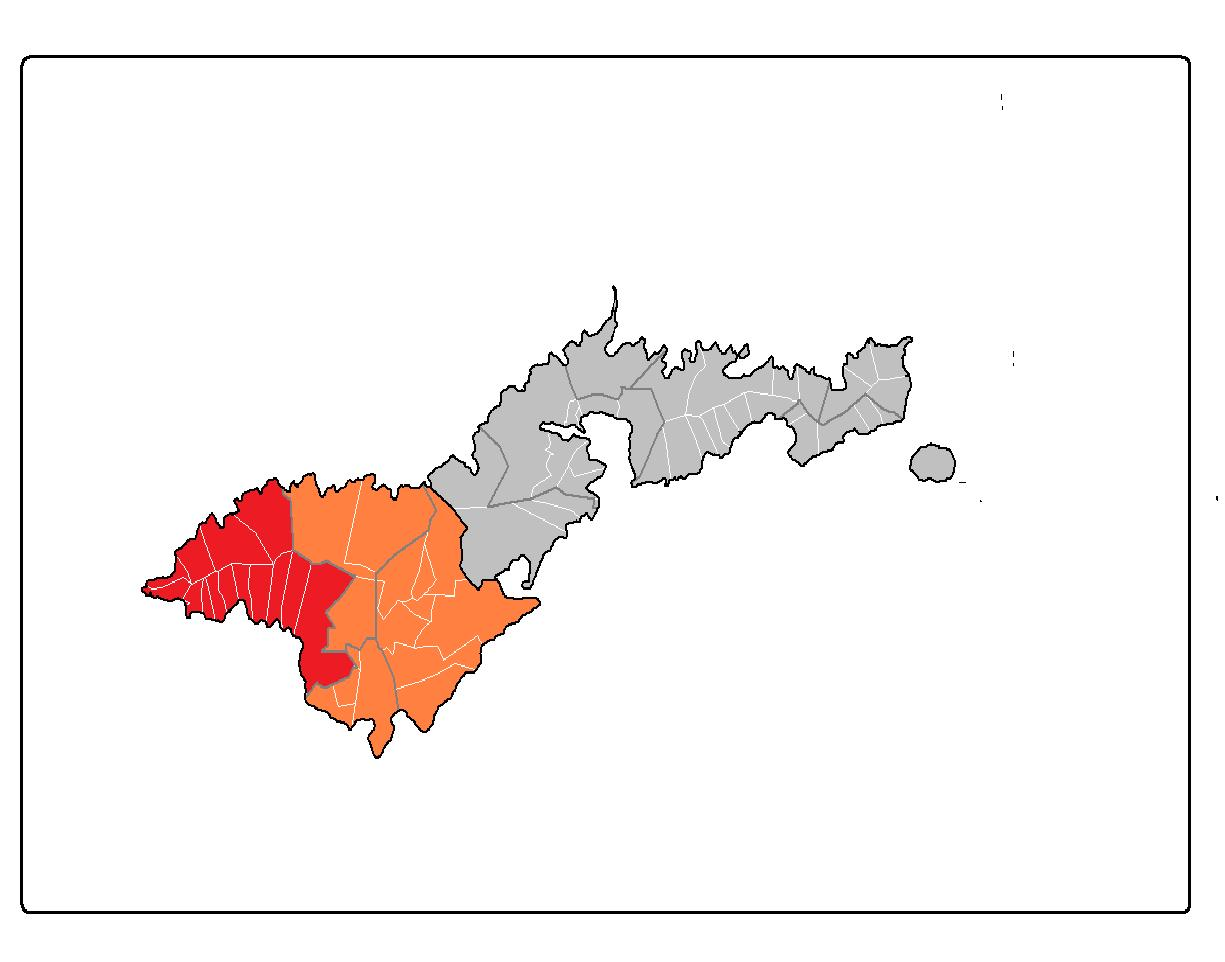
Map of Tutuila where Lealataua County is highlighted in red, while the Western District is marked in orange.

Lealataua County is a county in the Western District in American Samoa.

== History ==
In May 1956, the Aliʻi (High Chief) and tulafale (High Talking Chief) of Lealataua County were unable to reach a consensus on a single candidate for county chief. Consequently, Governor Richard Barrett Lowe intervened by setting a deadline for their discussions, requiring them to submit the names of all eligible and qualified candidates still under consideration by the county council.

== Demographics ==
Historical population
Year	Pop.	±%
1912	1,163	—
1920	1,134	−2.5%
1930	1,256	+10.8%
1940	1,625	+29.4%
1950	2,201	+35.4%
1960	2,393	+8.7%
1970	3,145	+31.4%
1980	3,581	+13.9%
1990	5,106	+42.6%
2000	5,684	+11.3%
2010	5,103	−10.2%
2020	4,293	−15.9%
U.S. Decennial Census

Lealataua County was first recorded beginning with the 1912 special census. Regular decennial censuses were taken beginning in 1920.

== Villages ==
- Afao (including Atauloma)
- Amaluia
- 'Āmanave
- Asili
- Fagali'i
- Fagamalo
- Agagulu
- Failolo
- Leone
- Poloa
- Nua
- Seʻetaga

== Landmarks ==
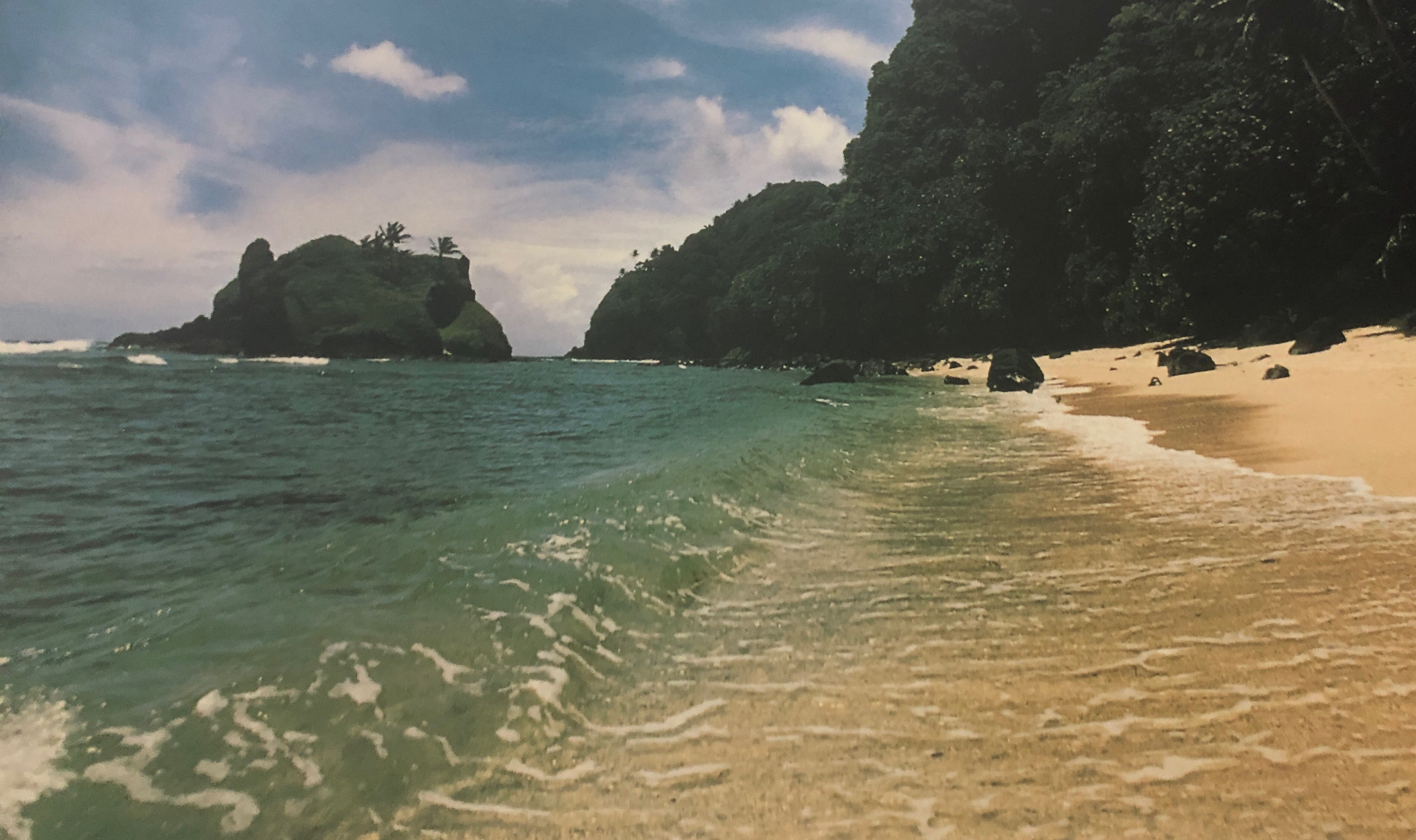
A beach between Poloa and 'Āmanave.

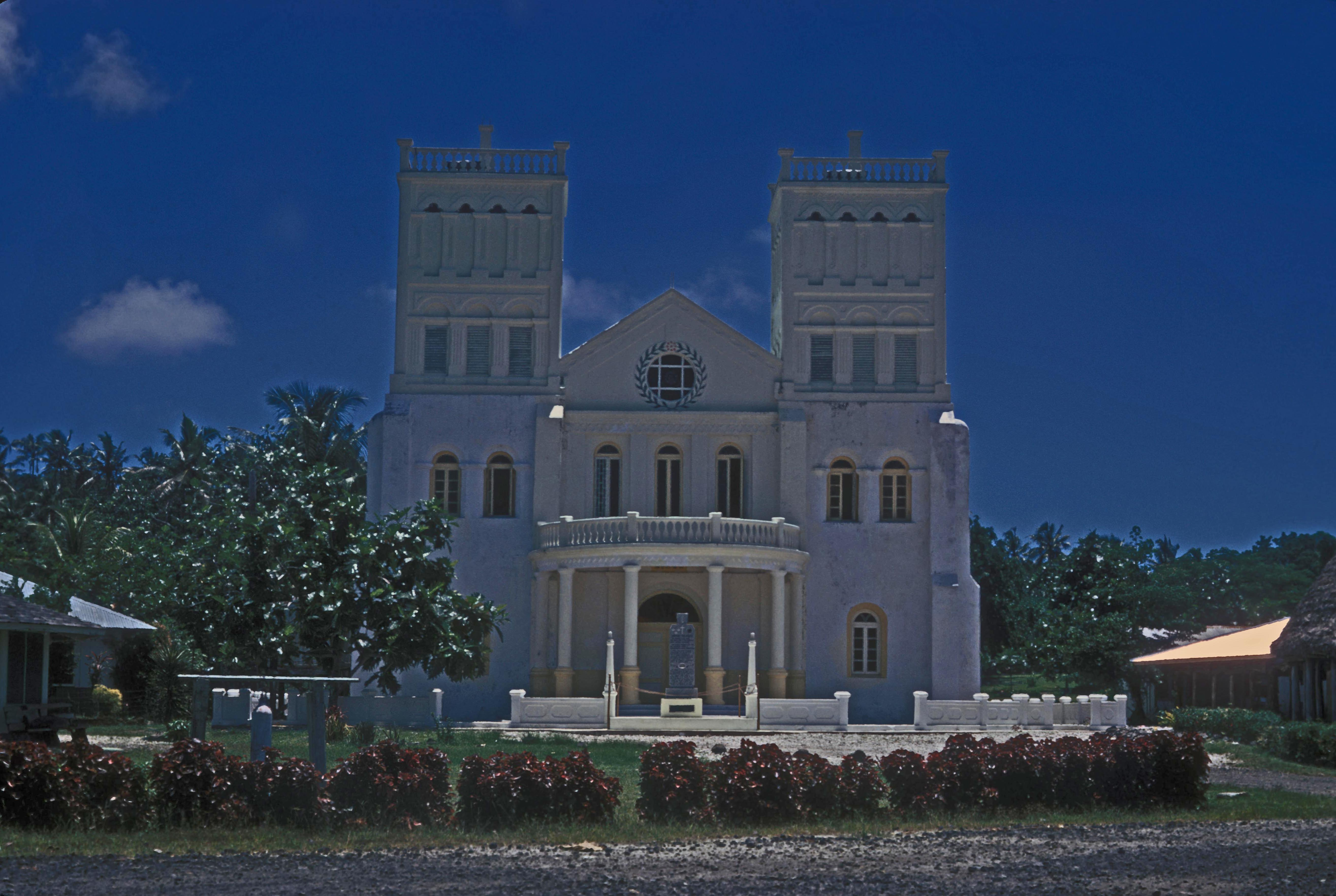
Siona Church in Leone.

- Atauloma Girls School, in Atauloma
- Cape Taputapu National Natural Landmark, westernmost point on Tutuila Island
- Fagalele Boys School: May be the oldest building on Tutuila Island.
- Leone Congregational Christian Church (Siona), church in Leone with a historic monument dedicated to John Williams
- Leone Falls, waterfall in Leone
- Leone Healing Garden, in Leone
- Mauga o Alii (Mountain of Chiefs), in Leone
- Palagi Beach, beach in 'Āmanave
- Poloa Defensive Fortifications, in Poloa
- Tataga-Matau Fortified Quarry Complex, in Leone
