= Shalimar Seiuli =

American-Samoan dancer and public figure (1976–1998)

- Born: July 6, 1976; Mesepa, American Samoa
- Died: April 22, 1998 (aged 21); Los Angeles, California, U.S.
- Other names: Shalimar, Atisone Seiuli
- Occupation: Dancer

Shalimar Seiuli (July 6, 1976 – April 22, 1998), known professionally as Shalimar or Atisone Seiuli, was an American Samoan dancer and public figure who gained infamy when she was seen getting into the car of the actor Eddie Murphy.

On May 2, 1997, Seiuli, a transgender sex worker, was being watched by police before getting into Murphy's SUV. Seiuli was unaware of who the driver was. Murphy was pulled over by police, questioned for thirty minutes, then released, while Seiuli was arrested for an outstanding warrant on prostitution charges. Murphy claimed he was just being a "good Samaritan" by giving Seiuli a ride home.

Overnight, the story made headlines, and was later parodied on an episode of Saturday Night Live. The National Enquirer paid Seiuli's $15,000 bond in exchange for exclusive details on her ride with Murphy.

== Early life ==
Seiuli was born Saoaumaga Atisone Seiuli, the oldest of four siblings raised as devout members of the Church of Jesus Christ of Latter-day Saints in the village of Mesepa, American Samoa. She adopted the name "Shalimar" after the imported French fragrance as a teenager. She was fa’afafine. Seiuli was the cheerleading captain at Leone High School and was crowned Miss American Samoan Island Queen in 1993.

By 1996, Seiuli moved to Los Angeles, California, where she began her medical transition via hormone replacement therapy. Upon first moving to California, she was enrolled at the Fashion Institute of Design and worked as a club entertainer. She funded her transition through sex work on Santa Monica Boulevard, a street notorious for transgender prostitution.

== Arrest and subsequent infamy ==
At 4:55 AM on May 2, 1997, Los Angeles Police officers followed and pulled over a Toyota Land Cruiser after watching Seiuli enter the vehicle. It was then discovered that the driver was actor Eddie Murphy. Murphy was questioned before being released because nothing illegal had occurred; however, Seiuli was arrested for an outstanding warrant for prostitution and sentenced to 90 days in jail.

By morning, the story made international news, with the tabloid The National Enquirer paying Seiuli's fifteen thousand dollar bond in exchange for details on her arrest. "It's unfair I went to jail while Eddie Murphy walked away scot-free", she told the Enquirer. Murphy claimed he was just being a "good Samaritan" by offering Seiuli a ride home. He denied any premeditated intention to solicit a sex worker and denied knowing Seiuli was a "male prostitute". People reported that the truth of Murphy's account of events was being questioned due to the fact that "when stopped, he was some distance past Seiuli's reported residence," and there was no apparent reason for the actor to be in that area at that time other than soliciting sex.

Murphy hired Hollywood private eye Paul Barresi to help defuse the scandal, paying other trans women who had sold stories up to $15,000 per retraction. Murphy also filed lawsuits against The National Inquirer, The Globe, and Seiuli’s relative, Ioane Seuili. Seuili claimed to have received threats since her encounter with Murphy, as she refused to change her story. Her brother claimed she became paranoid about a hit man following her and that she traveled often to evade the scandal.

== Death ==
On April 22, 1998, a neighbor in Seiuli's apartment building found her dead on the sidewalk outside the building. Discovered wearing only her bra, pants and a towel, police suspected Seiuli was locked out of her apartment, and tried to use a towel as a rope to slide or swing down from the roof to an open window. Instead, she fell five floors and suffered severe head trauma, resulting in her death, which was classified as accidental. The coroner's report stated someone heard a scream at 5 o'clock in the morning, which is believed to indicate the time of Seiuli's death.
