= Amaluia, American Samoa =

Amaluia
- Village
- Location within American Samoa
- Coordinates: 14°20′18″S 170°47′28″W
- Country: United States
- Territory: American Samoa
- County: Lealataua

Area
  - Total: 0.69 sq mi (1.8 km^{2})

Population (2020)
  - Total: 163
  - Density: 230/sq mi (91/km^{2})

Amaluia is a village on the southwest coast of Tutuila Island, American Samoa. It is located between Leone and 'Amanave. It is located in Lealataua County.

Masinaoleafiafi Ridge is located on the west side of the village, while Tutu Ridge is on its east side. A smaller embayment fronts the village. The primary stream is the Vaipuna Stream, which has around three tributaries and originates at an around 775 feet (236 m) elevation. The stream flows through Amaluia village before discharging into the nearshore waters that front the village. Two species of Mountain bass and two species of Goby fish have been recorded in the stream near the shoreline.

== Demographics ==
Year	Population
2020	163
2010	162
2000	179
1990	206
1980	215

From 1980 to 1990, Amaluia's population decreased from 215 to 206 residents. The population increased to 282 people in 1995. The proportion of village residents who were born outside of American Samoa doubled between 1980 and 1990. According to the 1990 U.S. census, the village contained 27 houses. The housing stock as of 1995 included 38 houses. Students enrolled in public school are bussed to Alataua-Lua Elementary School in Nua and Leone High School in Leone.

== Economy ==
As of 2000, there were three commercial enterprises based in Amaluia: a grocery store, a landscaping contractor, and a retail distributor. A large plantation is located along the middle reaches of the Vaipuna Stream north of the village, and the village was home to one piggery which contained six pigs as of 1996.
