= Seʻetaga, American Samoa =

Place in American Samoa

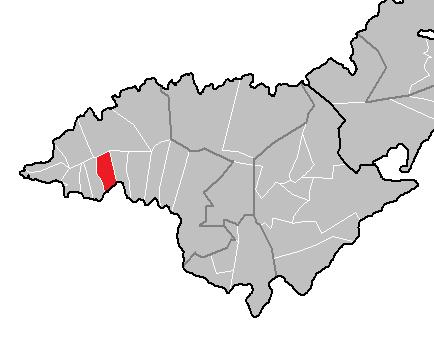
Location of Seʻetaga on Tutuila Island

The village of Se'etaga is a locality in the Western District on Tutuila Island in American Sāmoa. It is situated between Nua and Utumea West. Maugatele Rock is also located near Se'etaga Bay. The highway to Se'etaga from Leone was opened with a ceremony on November 2, 1927.

The name of the village, Se'etaga, is derived from the Samoan language and translates into English as “Sliding place”. On October 28, 1979, a landslide struck the village, claiming four lives. Triggered by fluidized debris flows, the event caused significant environmental damage but left most structures intact. Eyewitnesses reported a loud boom before the debris swept through the village and into the sea.
