= Agugulu, American Samoa =

Agugulu
- Village
- Location within American Samoa
- Coordinates: 14°20′8″S 170°49′18″W
- Country: United States
- Territory: American Samoa
- County: Lealataua

Area
  - Land: 0.173 sq mi (0.449 km^{2})

Population (2020)
  - Total: 42
  - Density: 331.9/sq mi (128.1/km^{2})

Agugulu is a village on the southwest coast of Tutuila Island, American Samoa. It is located close to 'Amanave, not far from the island's western tip. It is located in Lealataua County.

== Demographics ==
Population growth
2020	42
2010	51
2000	45
1990	42
1980	38
1970	44
1960	36
