= Poloa Defensive Fortifications =

- U.S. National Register of Historic Places
- Location within American Samoa
- Location: Poloa Beach; Poloa, American Samoa
- Coordinates: 14°18′59″S 170°50′03″W
- Area: 4.36 acres (1.76 ha)
- Built: 1941 or 1942
- Built by: United States Marine Corps
- NRHP reference No.: 12000917
- Added to NRHP: November 14, 2012

The Poloa Defensive Fortifications are a set of historic military structures on the island of Tutuila in American Samoa. Consisting of three concrete pillboxes along the beach, these fortifications were built by American Marines as part of a system of defenses against a feared Japanese amphibious invasion of Samoa during the early part of World War II. The Poloa pillboxes stand out from other emplacements on Tutuila for their relatively less robust construction, possibly reflecting American tactical planning for greater defense in depth at this location. The threat of invasion had eased by late 1942, and the fortifications never saw combat.

The Poloa fortifications were added to the United States National Register of Historic Places in 2012.

== See also ==
- National Register of Historic Places listings in American Samoa
