= Faʻilolo, American Samoa =

Faʻilolo
- Village
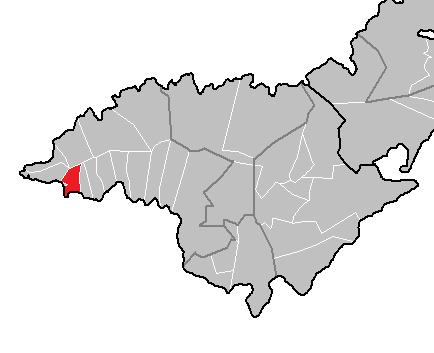

- Location within American Samoa
- Coordinates: 14°20′1″S 170°49′33″W
- Country: United States
- Territory: American Samoa
- County: Lealataua

Area
  - Total: 0.23 sq mi (0.6 km^{2})

Population (2020)
  - Total: 87
  - Density: 380/sq mi (140/km^{2})

Faʻilolo is a village in the far west of Tutuila Island, American Samoa. It is located just south of ʻAmanave, close to the island's westernmost point, Cape Taputapu. It is located in Lealataua County.

== Demographics ==
| Year | Population |
|---|---|
| 2020 | 87 |
| 2010 | 108 |
| 2000 | 128 |
| 1990 | 81 |
| 1980 | 76 |
| 1970 | 55 |
| 1960 | 50 |
