= Cape Taputapu =

Cape in American Samoa

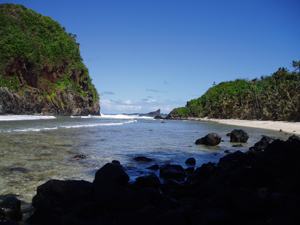
- Cape Taputapu National Natural Landmark

- Location within American Samoa
- Location: Poloa, American Samoa
- Coordinates: 14°19′35″S 170°50′33″W
- Area: 170 acres (69 ha)
- Designated: 1972

Cape Taputapu (Samoan: Tolotolo i Taputapu) is the name of a cape located in the Western District of American Samoa. Located in Tutuila, it is the island's westernmost point. The cape was designated as a National Natural Landmark in 1972.

Cape Taputapu is an important site in Samoan legends and also the location of a fruit bat colony. The coastline represents geologic features and an important habitat for intertidal flora and fauna.

Taputapu means forbidden in Samoan, and the cape was named so as it was the only site on Tutuila where paper mulberry trees were found. The discoverers wanted to keep the site and bark for themselves so they could sell it to other parts of American Samoa.

The cape's shoreline features volcanic rocks and blowholes created by the strong wave activity which also created Tutuila Island as a whole. It can be hiked during times of low tide, from a trail located in the village of Poloa. The cape is the last place on Tutuila where the sun sets.

== Description ==
Cape Taputapu National Natural Landmark features a mass of high, steep rocks and is fronted by several rocky islets. It is a geological formation featuring offshore volcanic rocks, rugged shoreline, and natural blowholes shaped by the relentless action of ocean waves. This site includes notable erosion-resistant volcanic rock formations along the shoreline, with one islet identified as a volcanic vent through which lava once flowed during a significant volcanic event that shaped Tutuila Island. Covering an area of 170 acres (69 hectares), the landmark is designated as a U.S. National Natural Landmark. Situated at the westernmost point of Tutuila Island in American Samoa, Cape Taputapu lies just beyond the village of ʻAmanave.

== Taputapu Island ==
Taputapu is also the name of a nearby islet known as Taputapu Island. Close to Cape Taputapu's southwest lies Taputapu Island, a rocky islet contributing to the rugged coastal landscape. Historically, a beacon was reported to exist on the summit of Taputapu Island. According to navigational records, this beacon, a white pyramidal structure standing 18 feet tall, was operational in earlier times. However, by 1962, the beacon was reported as nonexistent. The island's surrounding waters are known for strong currents.

== See also ==
- List of National Natural Landmarks in American Samoa
