= Atauloma Girls School =

Historic parochial school in Afao village, Tutuila, American Samoa

- U.S. National Register of Historic Places
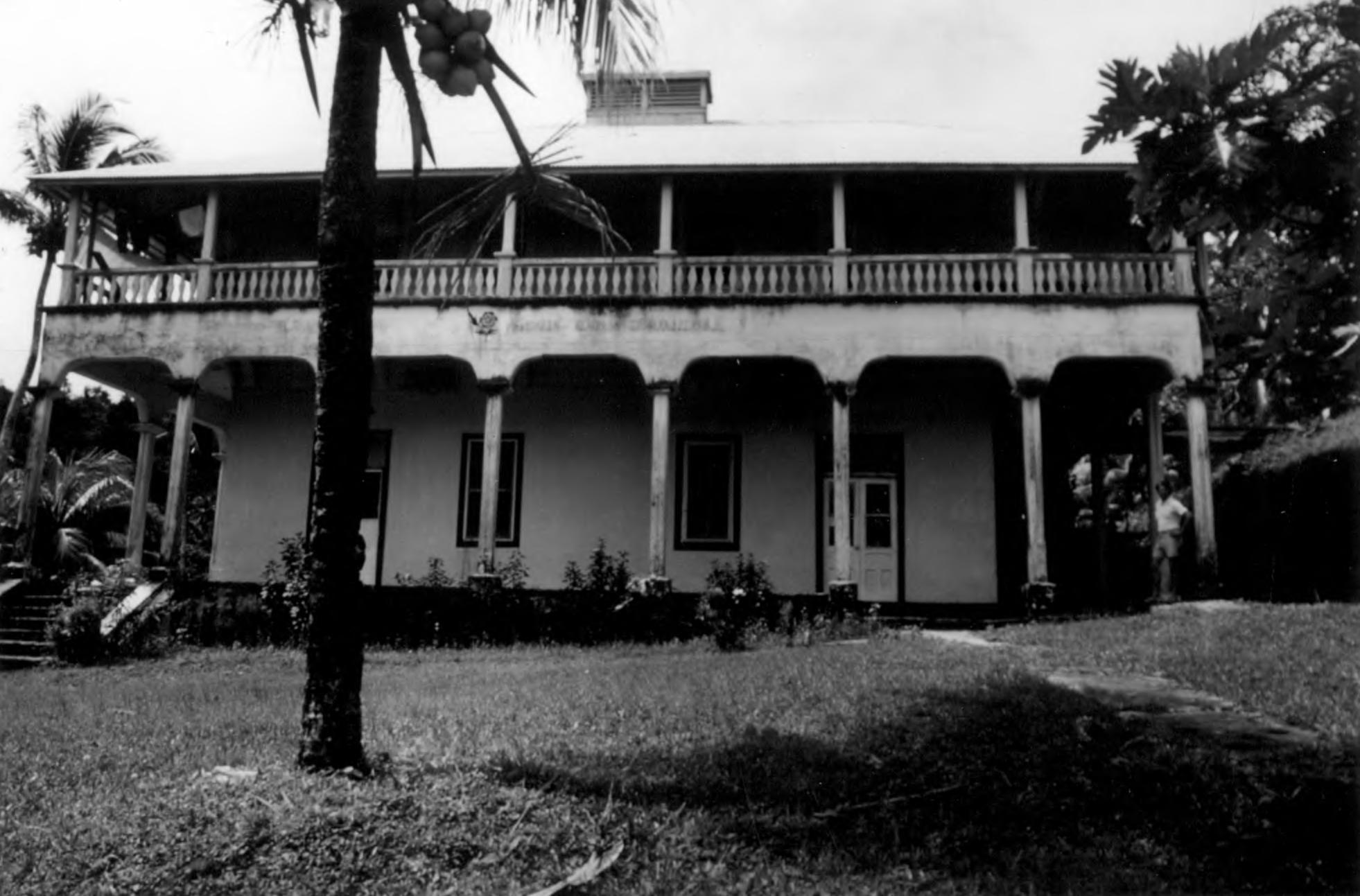
- The Atauloma Girls School ca. 1971
- Location: Afao, American Samoa
- Coordinates: 14°19′48″S 170°48′06″W
- Area: 6 acres (2.4 ha)
- Built: 1900
- NRHP reference No.: 72001445
- Added to NRHP: March 16, 1972

The Atauloma Girls School is a historic parochial school building in Afao village on the island of Tutuila in American Samoa, United States. The London Missionary Society began construction in 1900, making it the second secondary school on Tutuila (after the Fagalele Boys School), and the first to admit girls. For most of its history it prepared girls primarily to be pastors' wives, and after 1913 provided graduates to the nursing school at the naval station at Pago Pago. Its establishment saved Tutuila girls the necessity of travel to Upolu for secondary school, which separated them from their families and exposed them to the dangers of the international port at Apia. Atauloma was abandoned by 1970.

The school was listed on the United States National Register of Historic Places in 1972. It was featured on the television program Ghost Hunters International in its third-season episode "Ghoul's School" in 2012.

== History ==
The origins of the Atauloma Girls School trace back to Reverend E.V. Cooper, a missionary who spearheaded the construction of the school in 1902. Cooper, who had worked in New Guinea, succumbed to malaria during the building phase, and his burial site lies near the school plantation alongside several graves of children who perished in the influenza epidemic of 1918. The school was envisioned as the younger counterpart to the London Missionary Society Boarding School at Papa Uta, located in Apia, Western Samoa. Established in 1892, Papa Uta served as a model institution, and many of its students, alongside their principal Elizabeth Moore, were transferred to the Atauloma Girls School following its completion. Building work began in 1900 above the village of Afao. The structure itself was notable for its colonial architectural style, with coral cement foundations and walls, some measuring up to 20 inches thick. This effort was financed primarily by American Samoans under U.S. Navy administration, marking a period of collaboration between church, government, and the local community. The curriculum combined Western subjects—English, Arithmetic, Geography, Writing, and Scripture—with traditional Samoan values and practical skills. Students engaged in plantation work once a week, learning about nutrition and food preparation, while subjects like sewing, embroidery, and crafts aimed to nurture cultural pride and service to their communities. Environmental consciousness and respect for natural resources were central to the school’s teachings.

== See also ==
- National Register of Historic Places listings in American Samoa
