= Asili, American Samoa =

Asili
- Village
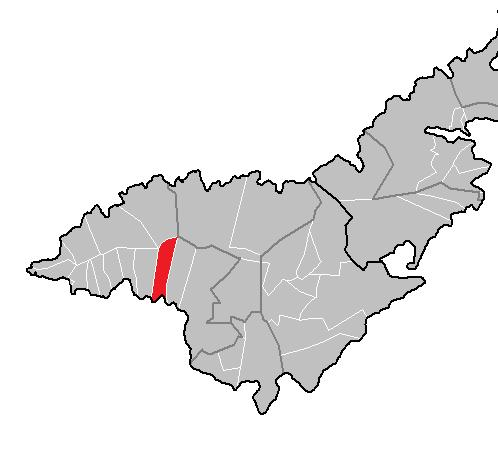
- Location of Asili on Tutuila Island

- Location within American Samoa
- Coordinates: 14°20′8″S 170°47′44″W
- Country: United States
- Territory: American Samoa
- County: Lealataua

Area
  - Total: 0.54 sq mi (1.4 km^{2})

Population (2020)
  - Total: 157
  - Density: 290/sq mi (110/km^{2})

Asili is a village on the southwest coast of Tutuila Island, American Samoa. It is located between Leone and 'Amanave. It is located in Lealataua County.

Both the Malagateine Stream and Asili Stream flow through Asili before discharging into the sea. A former World War II bunker is located near the shoreline. Several species of Gobie fish, as well as Mountain bass and Freshwater eel, have been recorded in Asili Stream. The Asili Stream originates at 1,190 feet (360 m) above sea level. It discharges near the center of the embayment that fronts the village. The main branch of the Malagateine Stream starts around the 520 feet (160 m) contour along the east side of the Malagatiga Ridge.

== Etymology ==
The name of the village, Asili, is derived from the Samoan language and translates into English as “The highest".

== History ==
In 1921, after Samuel S. Ripley faced deportation for the second time due to his role in the Mau movement, his brother Ned Ripley, a chief in Leone, convened a confidential gathering of chiefs in Asili in July. The purpose of this meeting was to address the shift in position among the high chiefs, who had begun opposing the Mau movement.

== Demographics ==
Year	Population
2020	157
2010	224
2000	250
1990	203
1980	145
1970	197
1960	104
1950	62
1940	79
1930	64

== Notable people ==
- Fuga Tolani Teleso, constructed the Veterans Memorial Stadium and the golf course in ʻIliʻili.
