= Nua, American Samoa =

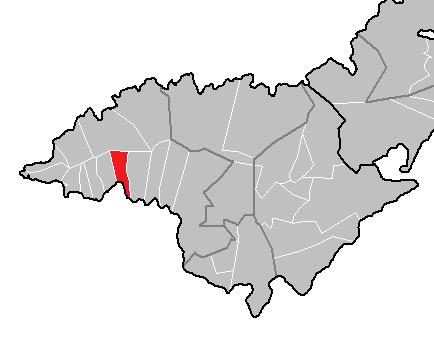
Location of Nua on Tutuila Island

Nua is a village located in Lealataua County within the Western District of American Sāmoa. Serving as the administrative center for the administrative unit called Samatua, Nua is part of a region that includes several small localities situated between Leone and the western cape along the southwestern-facing bay. These localities comprise Nua, Seʻetaga, Faʻilolo, ʻAmanave, and Afao. Samatua consists of six towns and translates to “Elder”.

== History ==
On October 5, 1890, the steamship Alameda made a stop near the island of Tutuila. Among its passengers were Henry Adams, an American historian and writer, John La Farge, a renowned artist, and Rioza Awoki, a Japanese traveler. The trio disembarked and boarded a small schooner. They had plans of visiting Apia, however, adverse weather conditions forced them to alter their course, leading them to the harbor at Nua, where they spent their first night. During their stay in Nua, they encountered Wakea, a ceremonial village maiden, and attended their inaugural Samoan dance performance, which greatly impressed and enchanted them. Although Adams originally intended to remain in Sāmoa for only a month before continuing his voyage, he extended his stay to over three months.

During their stay in Nua, Adams, La Farge, and Awoki were captivated by the beauty and hospitality of the villagers. The village women, adorned with garlands of leaves and flowers, performed the traditional sivā dance. Illuminated by the flickering glow of kerosene lamps, the dancers moved with a fluidity and poise that evoked comparisons to classical antiquity. Adams noted the dancers' glistening, perfumed skin and the profound connection they appeared to have with their movements, which he compared to East Indian sculptures. Meanwhile, La Farge likened the scene to living art, observing how the aesthetics of the dance transported him to a "Greek Golden Age." The visitors were equally struck by the spiritual and cultural depth of the rituals at Nua, which contrasted sharply with their Western perceptions of dance and performance. This experience left an impression on the trio, influencing their writings and artwork in the years that followed.
