= Faganeanea =

Fagane’ane’a
- Village
- Location within American Samoa
- Coordinates: 14°18′05″S 170°41′22″W
- Country: United States
- Territory: American Samoa
- District: Eastern
- County: Itūʻau

Area
  - Total: 0.74 sq mi (1.91 km^{2})

Population (2020)
  - Total: 93
  - Density: 130/sq mi (49/km^{2})
- ZIP code: 96799
- Area code: +1 684

Fagane’ane’a is a small village located in Itūʻau County in the Eastern District, American Samoa. It lies adjacent to the villages of Vasaaiga and Matu‘u, featuring a rocky shoreline and a scenic backdrop of steep mountains. A small coral channel near the village is known for choppy waters during high tide, while the Avau stream flows along its eastern boundary. The village is part of a picturesque landscape combining coastal beauty with rugged terrain.

Faganeanea is a hamlet of the village community of Nuʻuuli.

== Etymology ==
The name of the village, Fagane’ane’a, is derived from the Samoan language and translates into English as “Bay of delight".

The village name, like others in American Samoa that include the term faga (e.g., Fagaʻalu, Fagaliʻi, Fagasā, and Fagatogo), reflects its geographical and cultural identity. In the Samoan language, faga means "trap," and traditionally, villages with such names are situated in crescent-shaped valleys near the coast.

== History ==
Historically, village laws established in 1900 dictated strict agricultural practices for residents of Faganeanea and neighboring Matu‘u. Each individual was required to cultivate 100 banana plants and maintain a taro plantation. Additionally, village regulations prohibited the consumption of coconuts or copra until the copra taxes had been paid, without exception.

== Geography ==
Geologically, Faganeanea offers insights into the volcanic history of American Samoa. While no trachytic fragments have been identified in the Matafao breccia at Matafao Peak, whitish trachyte fragments are found in breccia blocks along Faganeanea's shore, suggesting material that may have slid down from the steep slopes of the Matafao volcanic cone. Evidence of geological uplift is also apparent in an apse-shaped sea cave located near Faganeanea, approximately 2 kilometers west of Pago Pago Bay’s entrance.

The Matu‘u and Faganeanea Village Marine Protected Area is located offshore.
