= Papa Uta =

Village in Vaisigano, Samoa

Coordinates: 13°32′4.57″S 172°43′38.71″W

Papa Uta is a village on the island of Savai'i in Samoa. It is situated at the west side of the island in the political district of Vaisigano. The population is 505.
