= Aʻumi, American Samoa =

Aʻumi
- Village
- Location within American Samoa
- Coordinates: 14°17′31″S 170°38′48″W
- Country: United States
- Territory: American Samoa

Area
  - Total: 0.90 sq mi (2.32 km^{2})
- Elevation: 20 ft (6 m)

Population (2020)
  - Total: 176
  - Density: 196/sq mi (75.9/km^{2})

Aʻumi is a village on the central south coast of Tutuila Island, American Samoa.

It is located to the east of Pago Pago Harbor and west of Alega.

Fatutoʻaga Rock (Pyramid Rock) is an islet which lies outside Lauliʻi near Aumi. Eastbound buses from Downtown Pago Pago go to the beaches near Pyramid Rock.

== Demographics ==
Year	Population
2020	176
2010	186
2000	249
1990	228
1980	155
