= Faleāsao, American Samoa =

Village in American Samoa

Faleāsao
- Village
- Interactive map of Faleāsao
- Location within American Samoa
- Coordinates: 14°13′18″S 169°30′47″W
- Country: United States
- Territory: American Samoa
- District: Manuʻa
- County: Faleāsao

Area
  - Total: 4.45 sq mi (11.53 km^{2})

Population (2020)
  - Total: 104
  - Density: 23.4/sq mi (9.02/km^{2})

Faleāsao is a village in American Samoa. Administratively, it is located in Faleāsao County, Manuʻa District, on the northern shore of Taʻū Island. It is divided into two sub-villages: Siʻuaʻi, consisting of the eastern half; and Tufulele (Tufu), consisting of the western half. It has traditionally been led by a high chief known as Asoʻau.

== Administration ==
Faleāsao is subordinate to a county of the same name. The county is part of Manuʻa District, which consists of the Manuʻa Islands. Faleāsao is located on the northern shore of Taʻū Island, the largest of the Manuʻa Islands. Historically, the village has been led by a high chief who holds the title of Asoʻau.

Faleāsao has been called the capital of the Manuʻa Islands.

== Geography ==
Faleāsao lies on Faleāsao Bay on the extreme northwest coast of Taʻū Island. The narrow bay is closed off towards the north by a 300-foot (91 m)-500-foot (150 m) high bluff and protected towards the south by a low cliffy promontory known as Malinuʻu. A wide border reef fills most of the narrow bay.

Faleāsao has a white sandy beach; offshore there is much coral just below the surface that is exposed at low tide. It is bordered by the Tunoa Ridge and lies south of Siʻulagi Point. There is a nearby hiking trail on Agricultural Road leading to Tunoa Ridge. Barn owls and fruit bats are common by Tunoa Ridge during mornings.

== History ==
On January 17, 1987, Cyclone Tusi struck the Manuʻa Islands with sustained winds of about 110 mph, destroying nearly 100% structures in Faleāsao and leveling roughly 90% of buildings on the island.

The power plant and elementary school in Faleāsao were severely damaged by Cyclone Olaf in 2005.

== Demographics ==
Historical population
Year	Pop.	±%
1912	238	—
1920	269	+13.0%
1930	279	+3.7%
1940	340	+21.9%
1950	368	+8.2%
1960	345	−6.2%
1970	288	−16.5%
1980	263	−8.7%
1990	246	−6.5%
2000	135	−45.1%
2010	162	+20.0%
2020	104	−35.8%
U.S. Decennial Census

Faleāsao County was first recorded beginning with the 1912 special census. Regular decennial censuses have been taken since 1920. The most recent census in 2020 recorded a population of 104 in Faleāsao County.
