= Ficus scabra =

Conservation status
- Least Concern (IUCN 3.1)

Scientific classification
- Kingdom: Plantae
- Clade: Tracheophytes
- Clade: Angiosperms
- Clade: Eudicots
- Clade: Rosids
- Order: Rosales
- Family: Moraceae
- Genus: Ficus
- Species: F. scabra

Binomial name
- Ficus scabra G.Forst.

Synonyms
- Ficus ciliata Warb.; Ficus mareensis Warb.; Ficus reineckei Warb.; Ficus storckii var. pubescens Bureau; Ficus turbinata Willd.; Necalistis turbinata (Willd.) Raf.

Species of fig tree from the Southwest Pacific

Ficus scabra is a fig species in the family Moraceae. It is a tree native to Fiji, New Caledonia, Niue, the Samoan Islands, Tonga, Vanuatu, and Wallis and Futuna in the southwestern Pacific, where it grows in lowland tropical moist forest.
