= Malaeloa/Ituau, American Samoa =

Itūʻau
- Village
- Etymology: Samoan: "War Side"
- Location within American Samoa
- Coordinates: 14°21′05″S 170°46′55″W
- Country: United States
- Territory: American Samoa
- Island: Tutuila Island
- Named for: Samoan Mythology

Area
  - Land: 0.23 sq mi (0.60 km^{2})

Population (2020)
  - Total: 424
  - Density: 1,800/sq mi (710/km^{2})
- Time zone: UTC−11 (Samoa Time Zone)
- ZIP Code: 96799
- Area code: +1 684

Itūʻau, together with Aitūlagi, make up the village of Malaeloa (long ceremonial-green).

Aitūlagi is the name of the famed family of high orator chiefs (tama matua) from the Leāsina county.

Itūʻau along with the villages of Fūtiga, Taputimu and Vailoatai form the itūmalo (county/district) o Tuālātai.

Although Itūʻau and Aitūlagi align themselves with different counties, today they operate together in many respects as one village under the name of Malaeloa.

== Tutuila Deed of Cession ==
Amituanaʻi of Itūʻau was a signatory to the Tutuila Deed of Cession of 1900.

== Etymology ==
Itūʻau can literally be translated as "war side". The itūʻau and the alātaua (war path) were roles assumed by allied villages or districts during times of conflict. This was a common practice throughout pre-contact Samoa, with its roots in the first Mālietoa government. The function of the itūʻau role can be described as a "controller of troops", whereas the alātaua role can be described as a "director of wars". These functions were carried out by the tulafale (talking chiefs) of the villages or districts designated with these respective roles.

The name of the village, Malaeloa, is derived from the Samoan language and translates into English as “Long malae".

== Historical Sites ==
The Malaeloa Itūʻau Olo Site (or defensive fortification), which was nominated for the National Register of Historic Places in 2015, is supported by Samoan cultural histories and oral traditions relating to interregional conflicts and defenses against cannibalism during pre-contact periods. It was built to protect villagers from Tuifeʻai, the legendary cannibal king of Tutuila, and his aumaga (army).

== Demographics ==
Year	Population
2020	424
2010	550
2000	627
1990	523
1980	467
