= Malaeloa/Aitulagi, American Samoa =

Village in American Samoa

Coordinates: 14°20′15″S 170°46′02″W

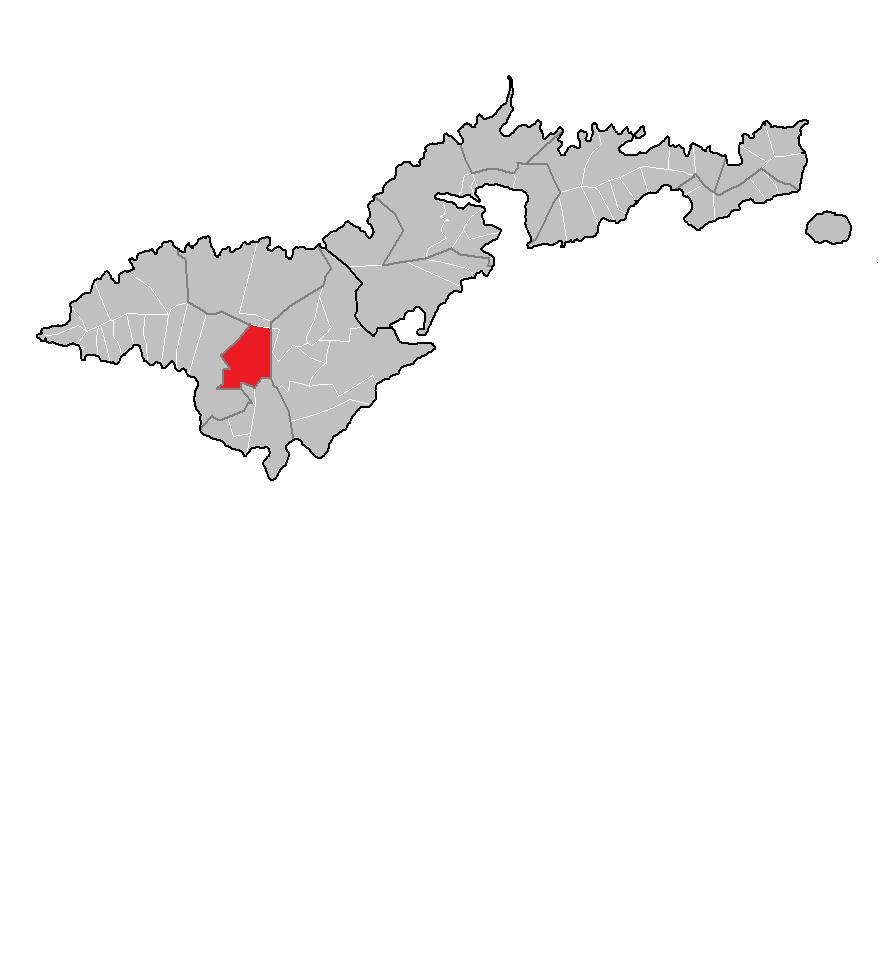
Location of Malaeloa-Aitulagi on Tutuila Island

Malaeloa/Aitulagi is a village in American Samoa. The neighboring village to the south is Malaeloa/Ituau. Malaeloa/Aitulagi had a population of 698 in 2010.

Malaeloa/Aitulagi has a weather station. The highest and lowest recorded temperatures in American Samoa were recorded in Malaeloa/Aitulagi: 99 °F (37.2 °C) on April 27, 1972, and 53 °F (11.6 °C) on March 28, 1962. (The high record is tied with a record at Pago Pago International Airport).
