= Afao, American Samoa =

Afao
- Village
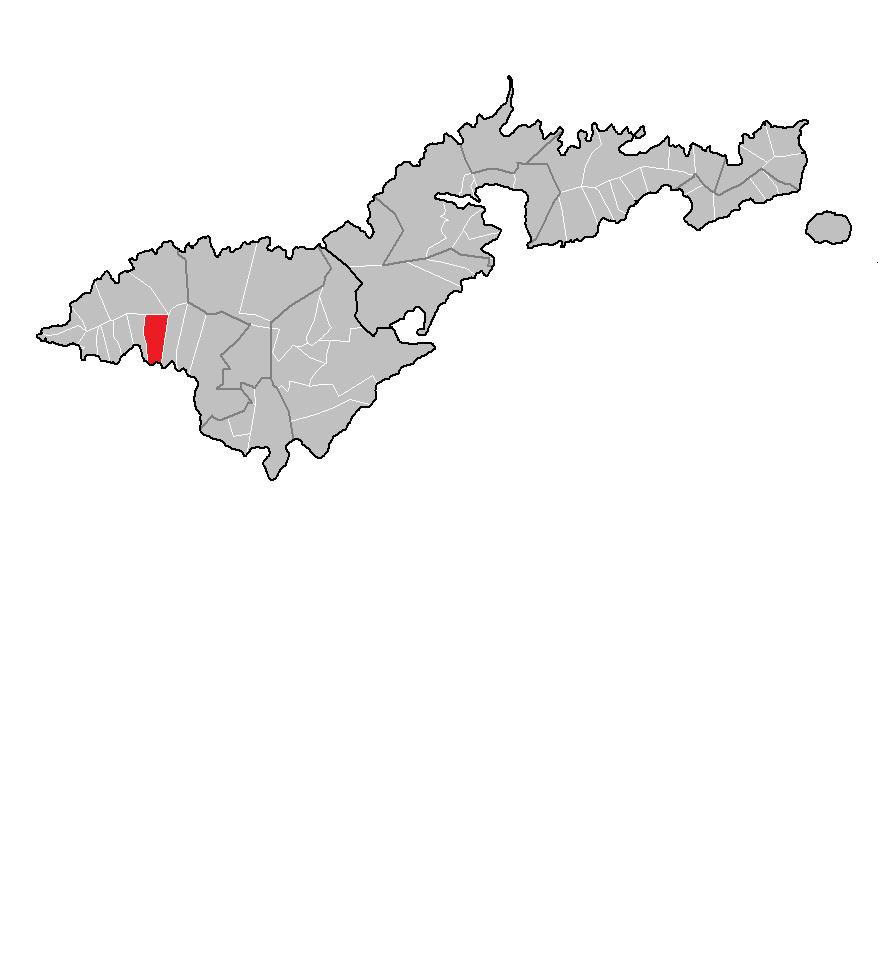
- Afao's location on Tutuila Island

- Location within American Samoa
- Coordinates: 14°20′12″S 170°47′57″W
- Country: United States
- Territory: American Samoa
- County: Lealataua

Area
  - Total: 0.54 sq mi (1.4 km^{2})

Population (2020)
  - Total: 96
  - Density: 335.5/sq mi (129.5/km^{2})

Afao is a village in southwest Tutuila Island, American Samoa. It is located on the island's short southwestern coast, between 'Amanave and Leone, to the southwest of Pago Pago. It includes the settlement of Atauloma. Afao is home to two places listed on the U.S. National Register of Historic Places: Afao Beach Site and Atauloma Girls School.

In 1899, the London Missionary Society (LMS) started to raise funds to construct a girls’ school at Atauloma, and after $10,000 had been collected, Commandant Benjamin Franklin Tilley was invited to lay the cornerstone of its concrete structure. The girls' school was constructed in 1900 as the second secondary school on Tutuila Island, and the first school on the island to accept female students. It was established by the LMS and provided graduates to the nursing school at the naval station in Pago Pago. The school is located at the western edge of Afao, in Atauloma and was completed in 1900.

== Geography ==
Afao is situated one kilometer northwest of Leone, positioned at the head of Afao Valley. The valley floor extends from sea level up to 300 meters at the surrounding ridge tops.

== Demographics ==
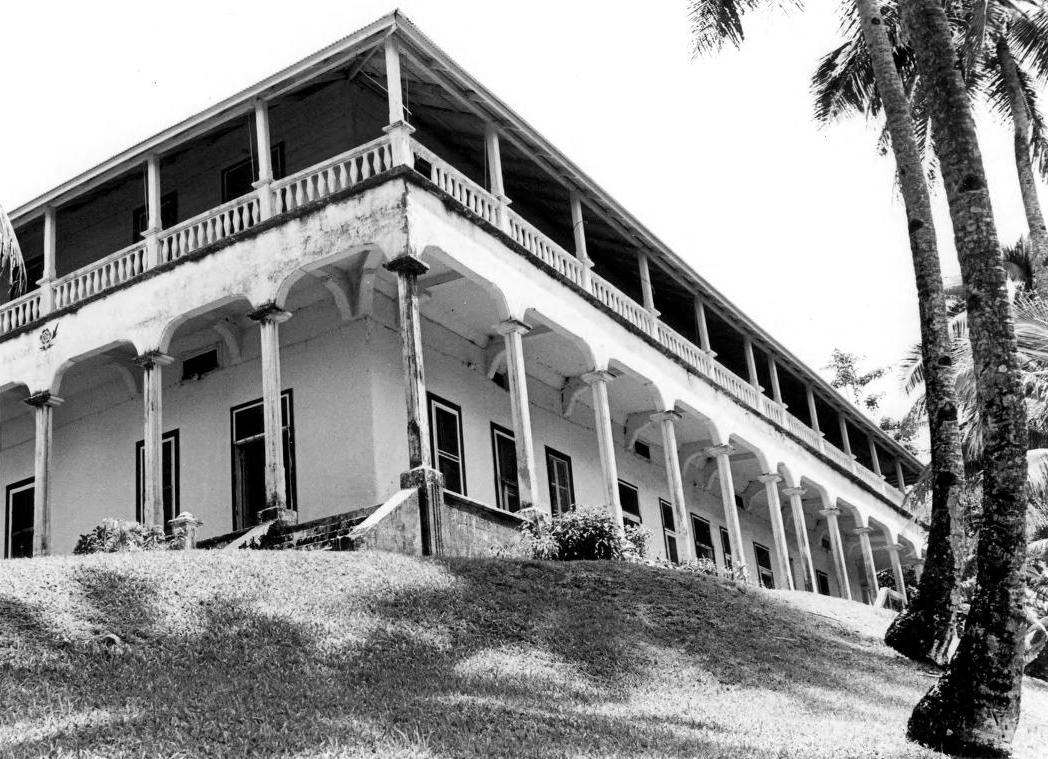
Atauloma Girls School

| Year | Population |
|---|---|
| 2020 | 96 |
| 2010 | 182 |
| 2000 | 188 |
| 1990 | 145 |
| 1980 | 80 |
| 1970 | 91 |
| 1960 | 52 |
| 1950 | 42 |
| 1940 | 45 |
| 1930 | 48 |
