= Mesepa, American Samoa =

Mesepa
- Village
- Location within American Samoa
- Coordinates: 14°19′53″S 170°44′40″W
- Country: United States
- Territory: American Samoa
- County: Tuālāuta
- Elevation: 154 ft (47 m)

Population (2020)
  - Total: 415
- Time zone: UTC−11 (Samoa Time Zone)
- ZIP code: 96799
- Area code: +1 684
- GNIS feature ID: 1389038

Mesepa is a village of American Samoa. It is in Tuālāuta on the main island of American Samoa, Tutuila.
