= Poloa, American Samoa =

Poloa
- Village
- Etymology: Samoan: "po loa"
- Location within American Samoa
- Coordinates: 14°19′18″S 170°49′58″W
- Country: United States
- Territory: American Samoa
- County: Lealataua
- Named for: Samoan mythology

Area
  - Total: 0.33 sq mi (0.85 km^{2})

Population (2020)
  - Total: 130
  - Density: 400/sq mi (150/km^{2})

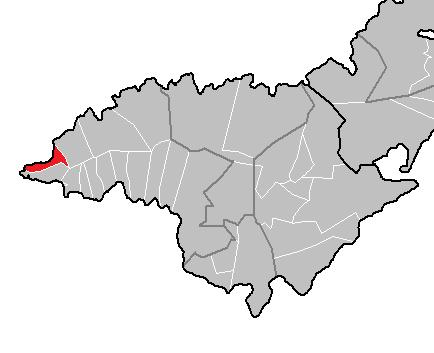
Location of Poloa within Western Tutuila

Poloa is a village in American Samoa. It is located at the west side of Tutuila in the Alataua District. The village has 193 residents in 2010. The main denominations in the area are Methodist and Christian. Poloa has one elementary school. It is located in Lealataua County.

Poloa is at the western terminus of American Samoa Highway 001. It is situated on a narrow coastal plain on Tutuila Island's western tip, 9 miles (14 km) west of Pago Pago. The village is made up of wood-frame homes and traditional fales. A school is located at the shoreline, approximately 700 feet (210 m) south of the village center. This elementary school has an enrollment of around 160 and also serves Poloa's neighboring villages. Due to the village's flatlands being ideal for development, the school was erected near the shore.

The village of Poloa is where the sun sets last on Earth.

== Etymology ==
The name Poloa denotes that once the sun sets over the horizon, it will immediately become dark, or Po-loa. The name originated from a premodern account of the travels of the legendary twins Taema and Tilafaiga, in their search for Fututalie, a Samoan prince who lived in a village at Tutuila Island's western tip. A unique characteristic of this village they looked for was that the darkness descends as soon as the sun sets.

== History ==
=== World War II ===
Due to its strategic location on the western tip of Tutuila Island, the land known as Sua in Poloa was utilized as a military station for about 2,000 U.S. Marines guarding the island against the Japanese fleets. World War II relics in town include pillbox forts and foot trails used by the Marines on the coastline. The military settlement brought about better roads and also a boost in the population of Alataua County. Three pillbox forts can be seen along the shore and an open tunnel can be seen at the entry to Poloa Village, known as Le Mafa. The three pillbox forts were erected in order to protect the island from Japanese forces entering from the west. The Poloa Defensive Fortifications were listed on the U.S. National Register of Historic Places in 2012, under the U.S. Department of the Interior. After World War II, the fortifications became social gathering sites for local residents.

=== 2009 tsunami ===
Almost every building in town was severely damaged by the 2009 tsunami, including most houses and a church. Reconstruction work was carried out under the command of the Federal Emergency Management Agency (FEMA). Two large tsunami waves struck the village. The first wave came from the north and the second wave from the northeast. The Matai saw the tsunami approaching and warned residents of the need to evacuate. Consequentially, almost all residents successfully escaped the tsunami. One victim was recorded in Poloa.

Taputapu Elementary School and the Early Childhood Education Center were completely destroyed by the earthquake-triggered tsunami. Funding of $3 million from the Federal Emergency Management Administration was given the village to rebuild, but they refused to provide funding for the school to be rebuilt at its original site, due to the close proximity to the sea. The elementary school was, therefore, to be built to the north in Fagalii. It was the last to be rebuilt of five elementary schools in the territory destroyed by the tsunami.

=== Village relocation ===
In wake of the 2009 tsunami that claimed one life in the village, the government together with the Federal Emergency Management Agency (FEMA) encouraged villagers to relocate and build their village on higher grounds within the village. Some families have complied, while others have stayed behind. With only the CCCAS church and a few houses left in Poloa-Lalo, most residents now live in Poloa-Luga.

== Geography ==
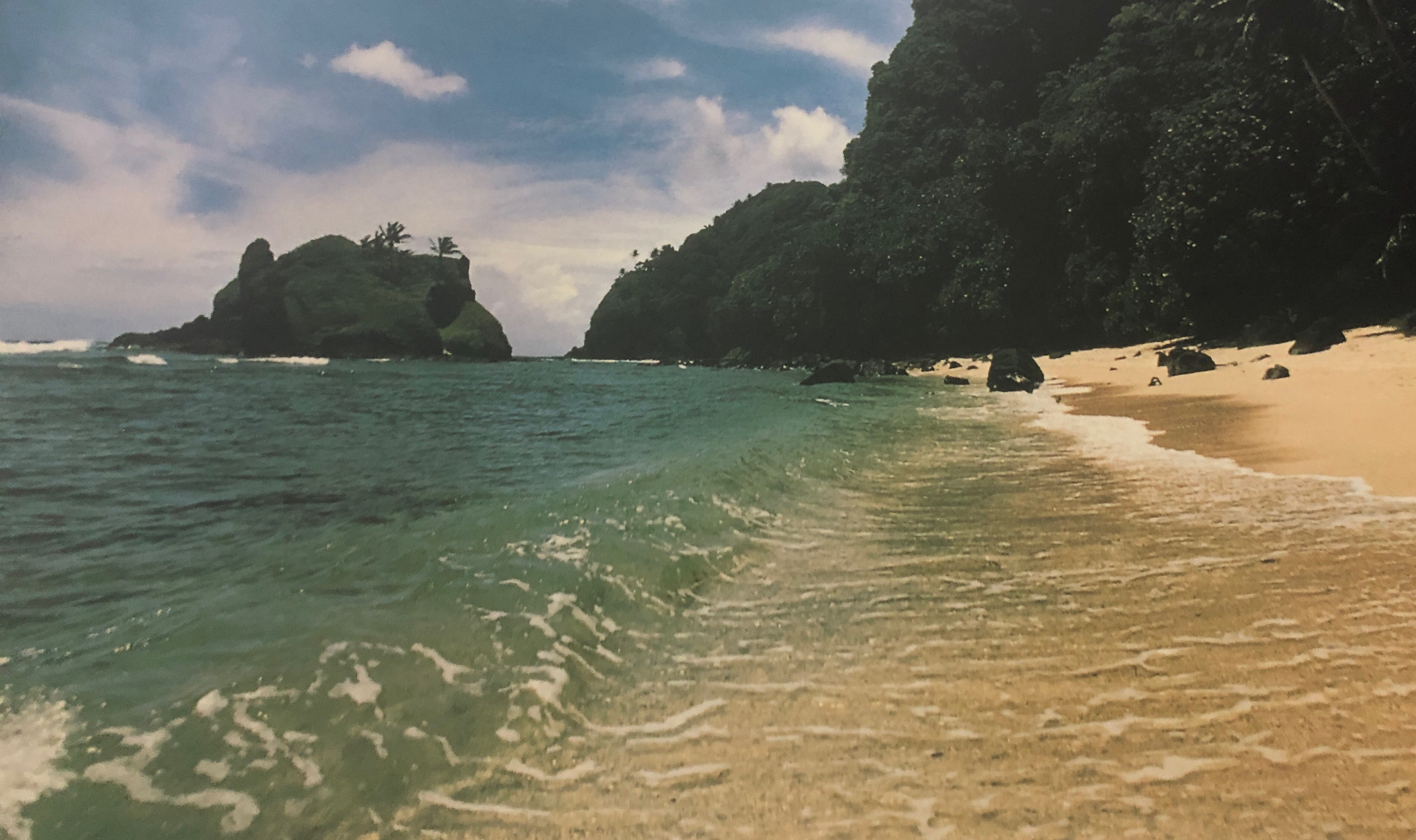
A beach between Poloa and 'Āmanave

Poloa is situated at the western end of Tutuila Island, around 19 miles (31 km) from Pago Pago. It takes about 30 minutes by car to travel from Fagatogo to Poloa. A half-moon bay outlines Poloa's coastline and sandy beaches. The steep forested mountains rise high on its northern boundaries. It is located on a mountain range and slopes of land that leads down to the coast. Villagers constructed their homes on mounds of land on the mountaintops and on the slopes and some flatlands. The public access road winds through Poloa from the open tunnel on the mountaintop and down to the low-lying lands of the village. The village is basically separated by mountain ridges and cliffs. The coastal-lying parts of town are known as Poloa-Lalo, while the sub-village situated on the mountaintop is known as Poloa-Luga.

== Economy ==
The majority of employed villagers work with the Government of American Samoa, however, a small number of residents work for businesses in the private sector or at the StarKist Tuna Canneries in Atu'u. Others stay in the village throughout the year as fishermen and/or farmers as their ancestors. Chickens are raised openly, not in pens. Small farms for everyday use often include Puka and Palagi bananas. Many residents depend on the soil and ocean for most of their diet. Subsistence farming is very common and includes crops such as banana, taro, papaya, avocado, giant taro, yam, and vegetables. Raising pigs and chickens are common and is done through the traditional way of poultry farming.

== Demographics ==
Year	Population
2020	130
2010	193
2000	203
1990	176
1980	126
1970	166
1960	119
1950	130
1940	95
1930	49

The population according to the 2010 U.S. census was 193, compared to 203 at the 2000 U.S. census. The reason for this recent drop was overseas migration to the mainland United States and Western Samoa.

The number of residents as of 2018 is 250. Elementary school children enrolled in public school previously attended Taputapu Elementary School in Poloa, but in the wake of the 2009 tsunami, children now attend Alataua Lua Elementary School in Nua. High school students attend Leone High School in Leone. There are two main churches in town: Congregational Christian Church in American Samoa (CCCAS) and the Methodist church. A few residents worship at the Seventh-day Adventist Church in Leone.

== See also ==
- Poloa Defensive Fortifications
