= ʻAmanave, American Samoa =

ʻAmanave
- Village
- Location within American Samoa
- Coordinates: 14°19′48″S 170°49′46″W
- Country: United States
- Territory: American Samoa

Area
  - Total: 0.342 sq mi (0.885 km^{2})

Population (2020)
  - Total: 246
  - Density: 720/sq mi (278/km^{2})

ʻAmanave (Samoan: ʻĀmanave) is a village on the coast of Tutuila Island, American Samoa. It is located close to the island's western tip, Cape Taputapu, and to the south of the village of Poloa. It is located in Lealataua County.

ʻAmanave was severely damaged by the 2009 tsunami. However, of a population of about 500 residents, no deaths were recorded. When the tsunami approached, emergency information was sent by radio and a bell rang in the village. After the tsunami, some residents followed the advice of the Federal Emergency Management Agency (FEMA) and moved into houses on a higher elevation.

Its mayor Aveao Faausu Fonoti received the Community Resiliency Leadership Award at the National Disaster Preparedness Training Center in 2010, due to his handling of the 2009 tsunami. The executive director of the center told reporters: "In spite of the fact that something like eighty percent of his village was destroyed, there were no casualties. And based on our research we found that many lives were saved because of his bravery, his leadership, his knowledge."

The village is in an area which is renowned for its rugged volcanic coastline. After its confluence with its tributaries near central parts of the village, Laloafu Stream discharges into the Pacific from ʻAmanave Bay.

== History ==
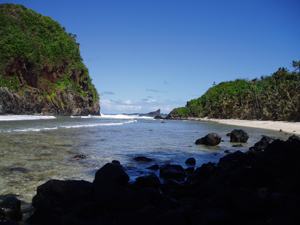
Cape Taputapu

The first formal school established on the island was Atauloma Girls School in ʻAmanave, which opened in 1900–1901. Although originally located in the village of ʻAmanave, it was later relocated to Afao. Remains from the historic site can still be viewed on the top of the hill in the Atauloma area of Afao village.

During World War II, the single-lane roads which for long had been connecting Alofau in the east to ʻAmanave in the west proved inadequate for military requirements. They were therefore replaced by a two-lane, coral-rock-surface road, which could handle the heavy military vehicles.

In 2009, ʻAmanave was one of the earliest hit and hardest hit villages in American Samoa during the 2009 Samoa earthquake and tsunami. Located at sea level, the tsunami waves destroyed or caused major damage to every building in the village.

== Landmarks ==
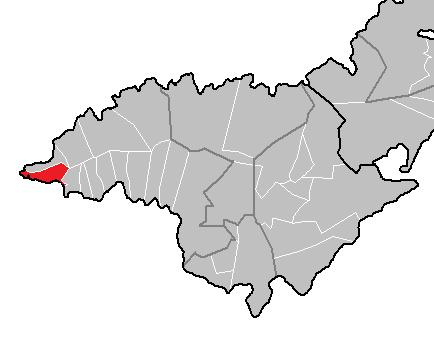
Map of western Tutuila where ʻAmanave is marked in red.

- Cape Taputapu National Natural Landmark is an exhibit of offshore volcanic rocks, shoreline, and blowholes sculpted by waves. Large sculptures of erosion-resistant volcanic rock dot the water shore, and one of these islets is a volcanic vent through which lava poured during the major episode of volcanism that made Tutuila. The total area designated as a U.S. National Natural Landmark is 170 acres (69 ha). It is the westernmost point on Tutuila Island, located just beyond ʻAmanave.
- Amanave Village Marine Protected Area
- Palagi Beach, a beach on Loa inlet, just past ʻAmanave and east of Cape Taputapu. It can only be reached by boat or hiking when low tide from the very west end of ʻAmanave. The trailhead begins just before the road turns to go over the mountain to the north side. The beach is a long stretch of white sand beach lined with coconut trees.

== Demographics ==
Year	Population
2020	246
2010	250
2000	287
1990	378
1980	269
1970	292
1960	269
1950	209
1940	123
1930	106

The 1990 U.S. census reported 53 houses in ʻAmanave. The proportion of ʻAmanave inhabitants born outside of American Samoa was 17% in the early 1980s and 29% in the late 1980s. In 1990, 43 percent of village residents were born outside of American Samoa.

== Economy ==
As of 1995, business license records from the government show eleven commercial enterprises based in the village. Businesses included five grocery stores, a retail shop, a gas station, and several bus companies. There is also banana production on the western side of the village, upslope from the shoreline road near Malama Point. Coconut production occurred east of ʻAmanave on the south side of Leafu Stream.

== Flora ==
Utusiva Island is located in ʻAmanave Bay and is known for its diverse vegetation. The islet is home to various species of shrubs and trees, including Desmodium umbellatum, Morinda citrifolia, Premna obtusifolia, Ficus scabra, Gardenia taitensis, and Barringtonia asiatica. Additionally, tree species such as Cocos nucifera (coconut palm), Thespesia populnea, Pisonia grandis, Grewia crenata, Diospyros elliptica, and Ficus tinctoria are found on the island. This rich assortment of plant life contributes to the ecological significance of Utusiva Island.
