= Tutuila =

Largest island in American Samoa

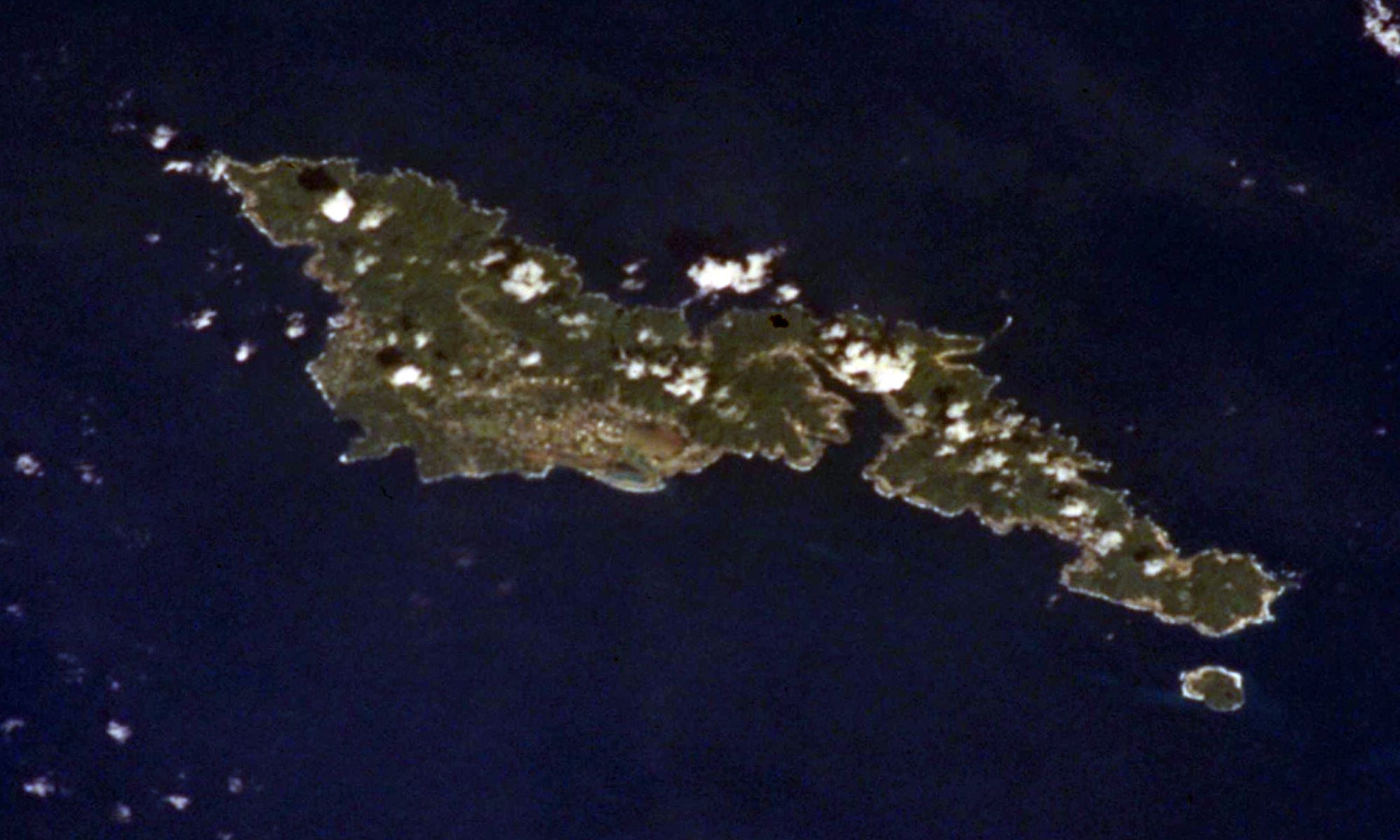
- Tutuila and Aunu'u from Earth orbit

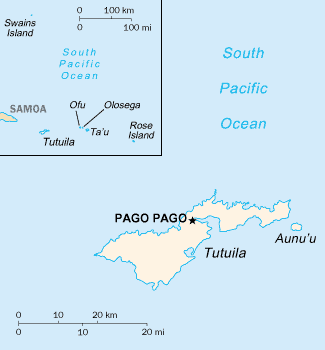
- Map of Tutuila Island in American Samoa

Geography
- Location: Pacific Ocean
- Coordinates: 14°17′42″S 170°42′00″W
- Archipelago: Samoan Islands
- Area: 142.3 km^{2} (54.9 sq mi)
- Highest elevation: 653 m (2142 ft)
- Highest point: Matafao Peak

Administration
- United States
- Territory: American Samoa
- Largest settlement: Pago Pago (pop. 11,500)

Demographics
- Population: 55,876 (2000)
- Pop. density: 394.89/km^{2} (1022.76/sq mi)

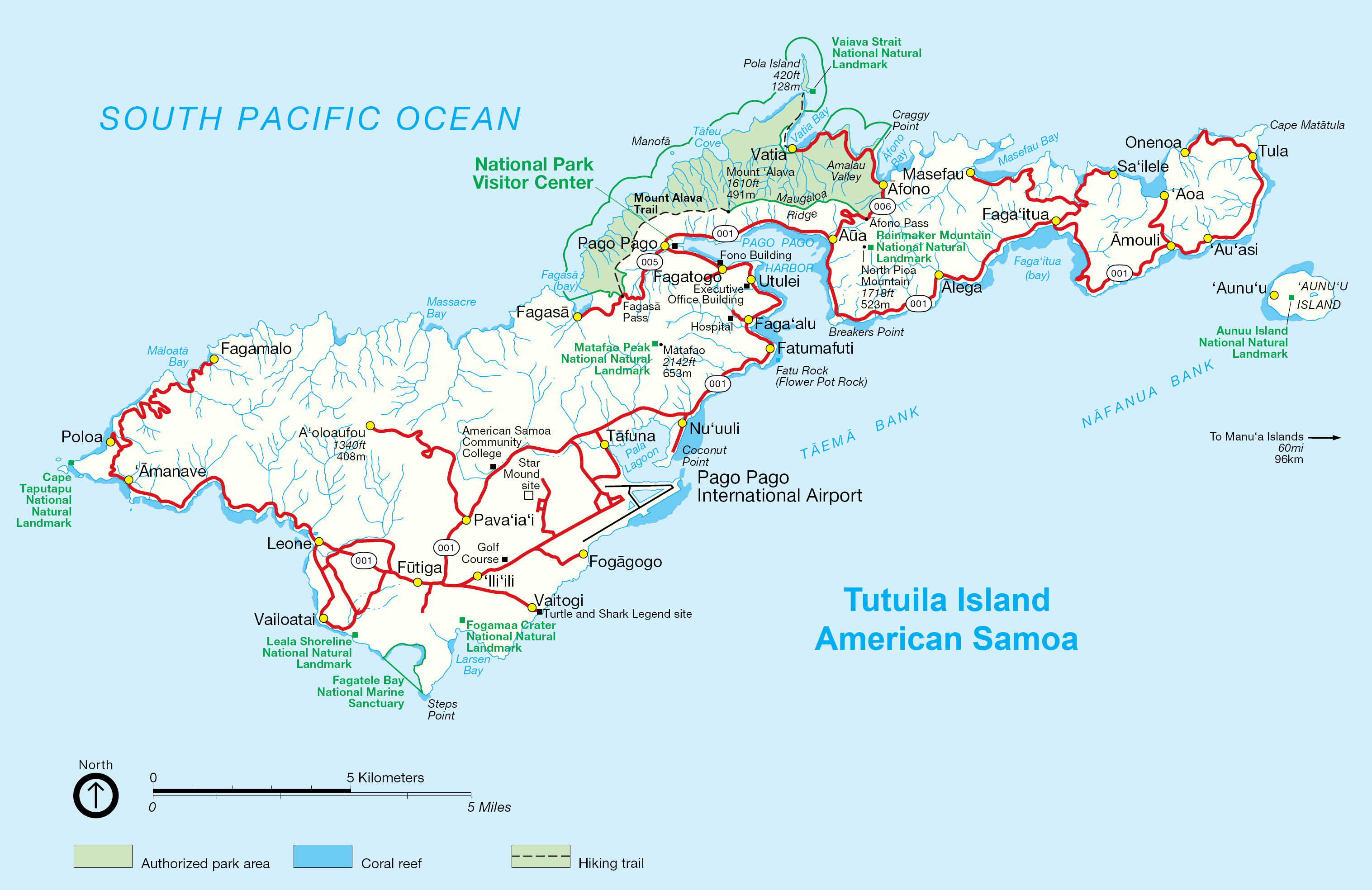
Map of Tutuila island

Tutuila is the largest and most populous island of American Samoa and is part of the archipelago of the Samoan Islands. It is the third largest island in the Samoan Islands chain of the Central Pacific. It is located roughly 4,000 kilometers (2,500 mi) northeast of Brisbane, Australia and lies over 1,200 kilometers (750 mi) to the northeast of Fiji. It contains a large, natural harbor, Pago Pago Harbor, where Pago Pago, the capital of American Samoa, is situated. Pago Pago International Airport is also located on Tutuila. The island's land expanse is about 68% of the total land area of American Samoa. With 56,000 inhabitants, it is also home to 95% of the population of American Samoa. The island has six terrestrial and three marine ecosystems.

Tutuila has mountainous regions, the highest point of which is 653 meters (2,142 feet). The island is attractive to tourists because of its beaches, coral reefs, and World War II relics, as well as its suitability for sporting activities such as scuba diving, snorkeling, and hiking.

== Etymology ==
It is said that the name Tutuila may have been given to the island by a woman named Salaia. She named the island after a combination of the names of her parents: Tutu and Ila. Another name for the island is based on the name of Salaia herself: 'o le motu o Salaia ("the island of Salaia") or motu sā (literally, "the sacred island").

In June 1722, the Samoan Islands were first encountered by a European explorer, Jacob Roggeveen, who gave Tutuila the name Thienhoven Island. Louis Antoine de Bougainville named the island Manua or Maouna.

== History ==
The Polynesians first reached Samoa around 1000 BC. By 600 BC, they had established a settlement on Tutuila at Tula. Over the centuries, the Samoans on Tutuila kept in contact with the inhabitants of the neighboring islands of Western Polynesia, Tonga, and Fiji.

Tutuila served as a place of exile for warriors and chiefs who had been defeated in the wars that ravaged much of Upolu for centuries. It was also used as a place to which Upolu rulers banished political opponents.

=== Tongan rule ===
Around 1200 A.D., during the reign of Momo, the tenth Tuʻi Tonga, the Tongans invaded and occupied Tutuila and other Samoan Islands. Their rule lasted for nearly two centuries under five successive kings. Taʻū Island, however, claims to have been spared - an assertion not entirely implausible, as Manuka and its king held a place of honor in Tongan legend. Like most occupying powers, the Tongans soon became unpopular, and the Samoans came to believe that their divinely sanctioned leaders were destined to drive the invaders out. From this struggle emerged a new class of heroes, warriors whose successes in battle marked them as natural leaders for Samoa's eventual liberation.

During the Tongan occupation, defeated warriors and political rivals were exiled to Pago Pago, whose surrounding settlements came to serve as a kind of penal colony. In time, resentment of foreign rule grew, and under the leadership of the paramount chief Malietoa, the Samoans rose in revolt against their Tongan rulers. Fau’au of Pago Pago (Chief Fua’autoa of Pago Pago) emerged as leader of the local resistance and succeeded in expelling the Tongans from Tutuila.

=== European contact ===
In 1722, Jacob Roggeveen became the first European to visit the Manu'a islands, located on the eastern end of the Samoan island chain. In 1768, the explorer Louis Antoine de Bougainville visited the islands of Samoa and dubbed them the "Navigator Islands," after the islanders' practice of navigating the nearby waters in canoes to catch tuna. European whalers and Protestant missionaries began to arrive in the Samoan Islands in the early 19th century, particularly in the 1830s. Two notable arrivals among them were John Williams of the London Missionary Society, and the French explorer Louis de Freycinet, who arrived in October 1819 and named Tutuila "Rose Island" in honor of his wife (and fellow explorer) Rose de Freycinet. European traders and Samoan islanders chose to develop the Upolu Island village of Apia, rather than the Tutuila Island village of Pago Pago, as their trading station.

However, in 1872, the US Navy recognized that Tutuila's Pago Pago Harbor would be the ideal place for a refueling station for the new San Francisco-to-Sydney steamship service, and negotiated a treaty with the inhabitants that would allow the harbor to be used for this purpose. Six years later, in 1878, the US Congress finally ratified this treaty, enabling it to be implemented. However, the US was not the only foreign government with an interest in Tutuila and other Samoan islands. Great Britain and Germany had been showing their interest since the 1860s. In 1879, with the Samoans having declared that they were open to dealing with all three countries, the United States, Great Britain, and Germany together formed a tripartite government over the islands.

In 1889, the three foreign governments held a conference in Berlin to discuss the political future of the islands and try to resolve their differences on that topic. The Americans expressed dissatisfaction with not having complete control of the islands. The countries' ongoing differences led to a proposal, in 1899, to apportion their control among different parts of the Samoan islands, with the eastern islands, including Tutuila and Aunu'u, forming American Samoa, and the western islands forming Western Samoa under European control. The Samoans signed off on this proposal in 1900, and the US flag was raised on Tutuila on April 17 of that year. However, the name "American Samoa" was not formally bestowed on the eastern islands until 1911, and the apportionment agreement was not formally ratified until 1929.

In February 1920, the Mau movement emerged to challenge the U.S. Naval Administration, and by the time Samuel Sailele Ripley returned home to Leone in July of that year, tensions had intensified, prompting him to align with the cause. The movement was suppressed by the U.S. government and Ripley was deported and barred from the island.

During World War II, Tutuila was a strategically important island for the US Marines. Led by Colonel Lester A. Dessez, they established a military base there and erected concrete bunkers along the island's coast. Despite the island's strategic importance, it escaped almost unscathed from the war, the only exception being an attack launched from a Japanese submarine on January 11, 1942. Since 1951, administration of Tutuila and the other islands of American Samoa has been the responsibility of the US Department of the Interior.

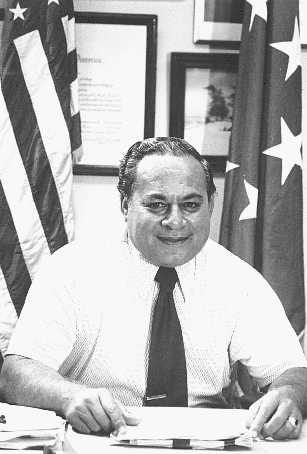
Peter Tali Coleman, the first Samoan-born governor of Tutuila and American Samoa

In 1956, Peter Tali Coleman became the first Samoan-born governor of American Samoa. In 1960, during his tenure, protections for the islanders were approved, including protection from confiscation of their lands and from loss of their cultural practices. After 1960, the Flag of American Samoa was made the country's official flag. In 1961, the US president, John F. Kennedy, appointed H. Rex Lee governor, and approved US expenditure of massive funds to develop Tutuila, which throughout the 1960s was used to finance the building of an international airport, seaport facilities, roads, schools, houses, a hospital, a tuna cannery, a modern hotel, and the installation of electricity throughout the country. in 1962, Western Samoa became independent of New Zealand, leading to uncertainty about whether the US would continue to have control of American Samoa. The massive US development efforts during the 1960s served to effectively solidify support for the continuation of Tutuila and the rest of American Samoa as a dependency of the United States.

In July 1997, Western Samoa changed that country's legal name to "Samoa." This name change was opposed by many Americans, including the inhabitants of American Samoa, who believed that using the unmodified word "Samoa" as the name for the country that comprised only the westernmost Samoan Islands would be confusing, and would undermine recognition of American Samoa as a distinct country with its own identity. Many American Samoans and other Americans who interact with the Samoan Islands still refer to Samoa informally as "Western Samoa," and to its inhabitants as "Western Samoans."

Today American Samoa is an unincorporated and unorganized territory of the US, under the administration of the US Interior Department's Office of Insular Affairs. American Samoa is primarily divided into two political districts: the Eastern District and the Western District.

=== Legends ===
A popular island legend holds that, when called to in a particular way, a shark and a turtle will appear near the shore. According to the legend, a long time ago, an old blind woman and her granddaughter, both suffering the pangs of starvation, jumped off a cliff in the village of Vaitogi and into the roiling ocean below. But instead of drowning, the old woman was transformed into a shark, and her granddaughter was transformed into a turtle. When the villagers utter a particular chant, the shark and the turtle promptly appear.

Another Samoan legend concerns a species of bat, known as the flying fox, which is found in a forested area of Tutuila that is part of the National Park of American Samoa. This legend holds that the flying fox is the protector and guardian of the forest and its human inhabitants.

== Geography ==
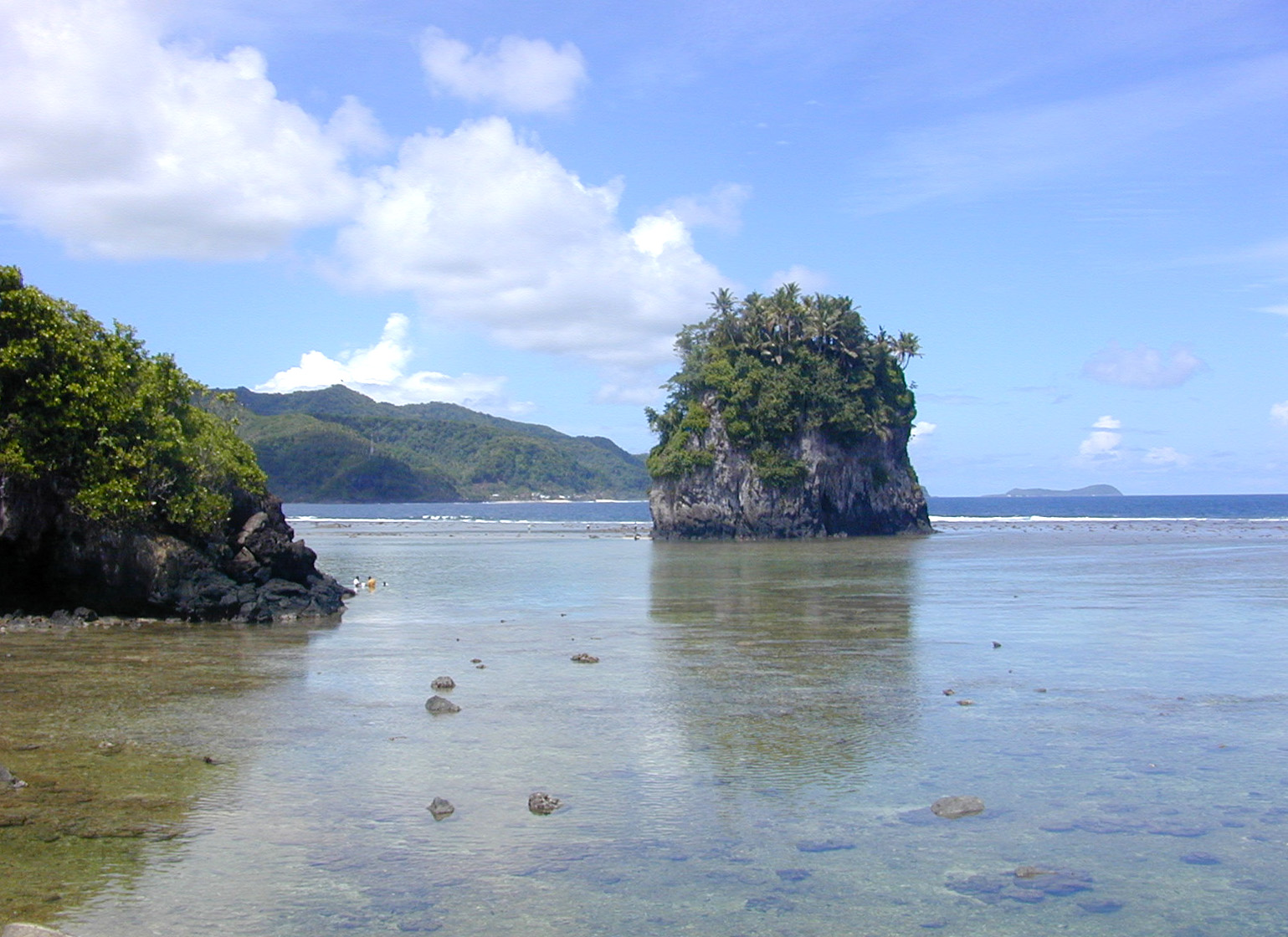
Fatu Rock (or Flower Pot Rock) in the reef of Tutuila at the entrance to Pago Pago Harbor in American Samoa

Tutuila lies in the Pacific Ocean, roughly 4,000 km (2,500 mi) northeast of Brisbane, Australia. The village of Fagatogo is situated 1,238 km (769 mi) northeast of Suva, Fiji. The island lies roughly 530 km (330 mi) north of Niue and roughly 580 km (360 mi) south of Tokelau and roughly 100 km (62 mi) southeast of the Samoan island of Upolu.

Tutuila is a fairly small and narrow island, measuring roughly 33 km (21 mi) across and little more than 3 mi (4.8 km) from north to south at its widest point. The area of this volcanic island of early Pliocene age is 142.3 km^{2} (54.9 sq mi) with a shore line of 101.3 km (62.9 mi). The hill range which runs from west to east is rugged and winding with the northern coast line having steep cliffs and unusual coast line. However, the southern part of the island has flatter terrain. Good beaches are located at many places along the coast. It has a wet tropical climate. The highest point in the Tutuila island is the Matafao Peak which is at an elevation of 653 meters (2,142 ft), which is highest peak in the island. There is trail opposite to the Mount ʻAlava peak (483 km (300 mi)) which dominates the northern part of the island. This 9.7 km (6.0 mi) trail is approached by a metal stairway from the southern end which goes right up to the peak. Trekking along the ridge through the rain forests without any additional support system, the scenic beauty of the South Pacific Ocean provides a delightful sight.

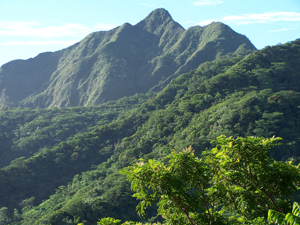
Matafao Peak, highest peak on Tutuila Island

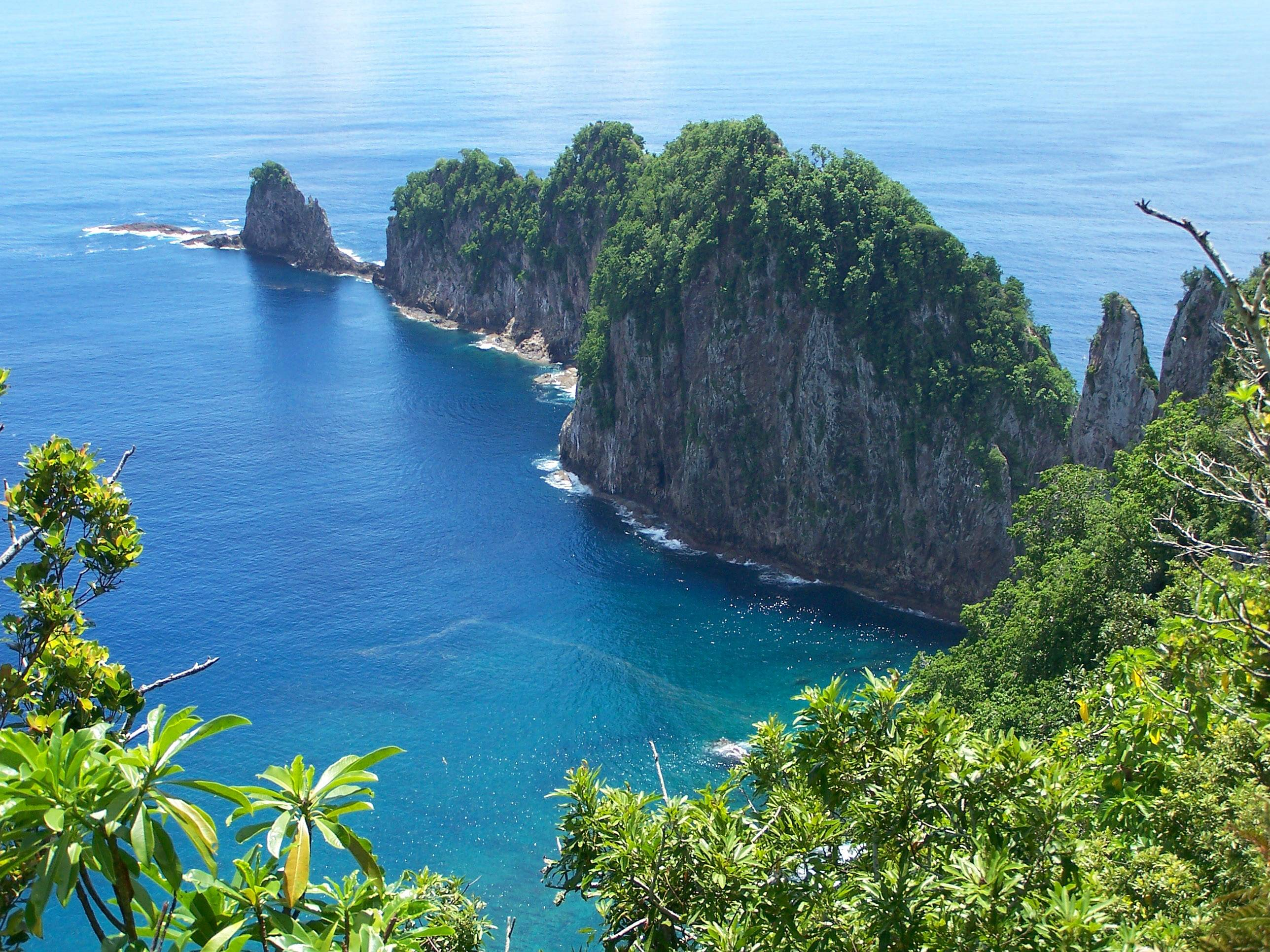
Pola Island near Vatia

In the early 19th century, navigators passed through the Tutuila, the westward island among the Samoan group of Islands (one of the four islands called as navigators islands), when it was also known by the names of Bougainville, Manuo or Maouna. Midway between this islet and the rock the navigators sighted the Pago Pago harbor, which was marked by "a conical hill on its western side and a flat elliptical topped hill to the eastward." Leone village, large and prosperous, was sighted to the west of the island. To the south-east of the island is the Aunu'u islet.

The coastal road runs for a length of 50 km (31 mi) from Fagamalo in the northwest to Onenoao in the far northeast. Important towns and villages now developed in the island are as follows: the Tafuna Urban area, the largest urban area in the territory, encompasses a string of villages from 'Ili'ili to Tafuna proper; Fagatago, the largest town with government offices functioning from Utulei (both are urban centers located to the northeast of Pago Pago); Pago Pago (a deep harbor that divides the island into two parts), the harbor town opposite to Fagatago; the Vatia village on the northern coast known for its famous beach and scenic setting, which is also a coral fringed bay; and Leone, a safe anchorage station in the past where the Europeans and Samoans first started their interaction in the early years of the island's history. The southwesternmost settlement is Taputimu, the westernmost settlements are Poloa and Amanave, the northernmost settlement is Vatia and the easternmost settlement is Tula.

== Demographics ==
The island has population of 55,876 (2000 census) (These figures include Aunu'u Island, off the southeast coast of Tutuila, which has a land area of 1.517 km^{2} (0.586 sq mi) and a population of 476).

== Economic activity ==
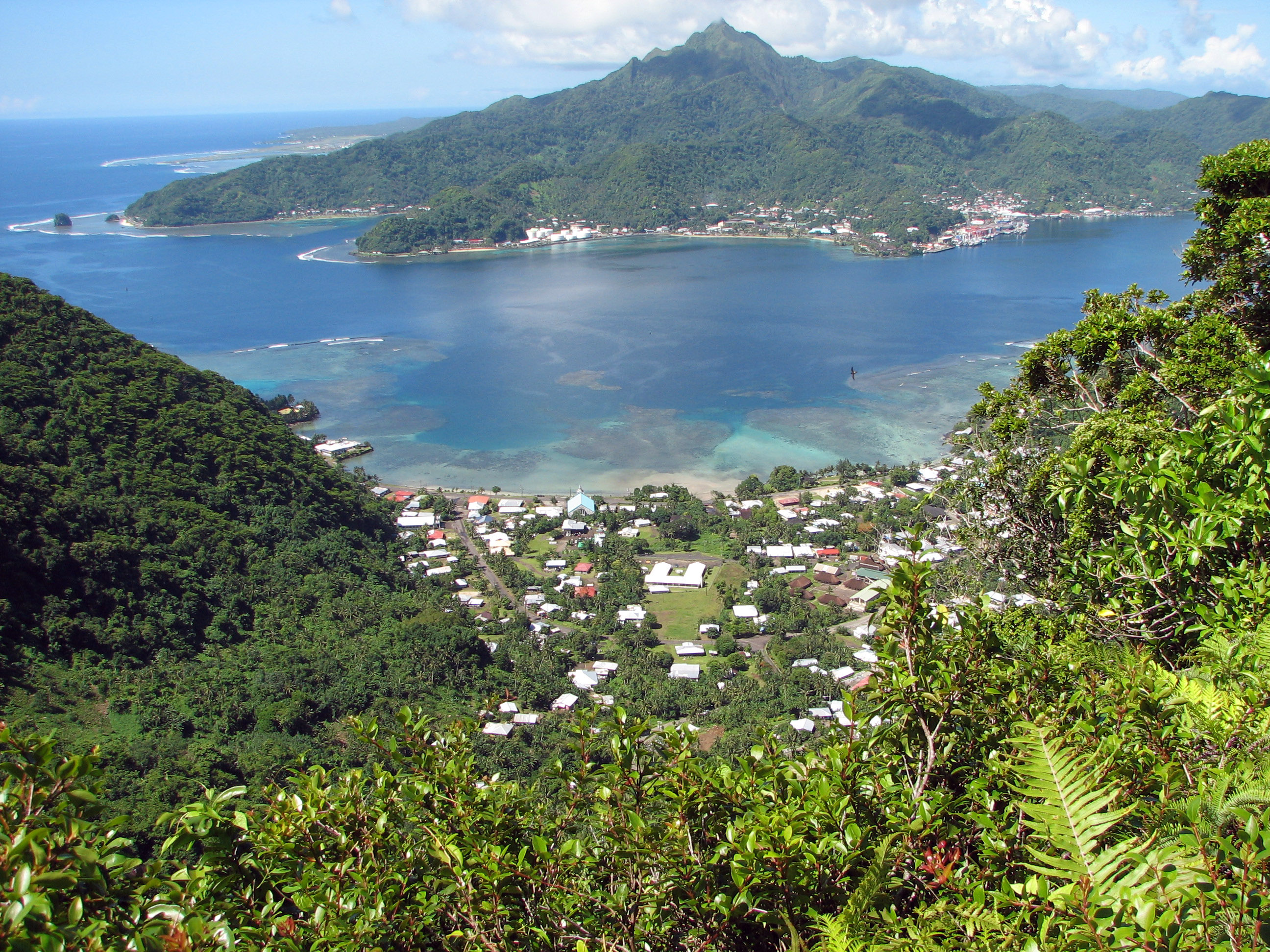
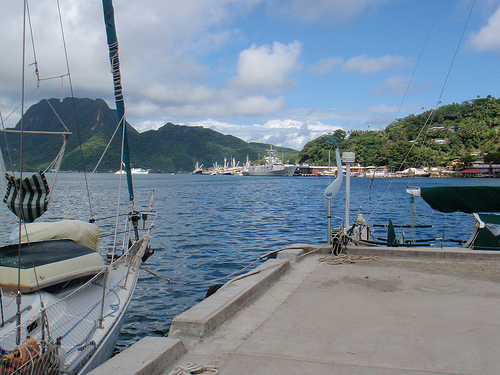
Left: Pago Pago Harbor. Right: Closer view of Pago Pago Harbor.

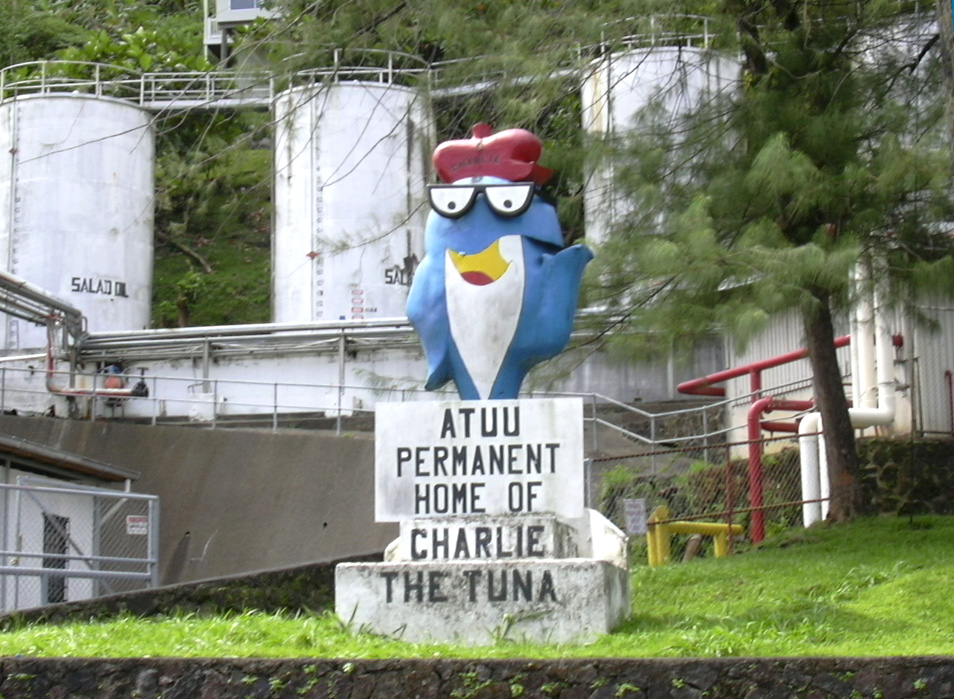
A statue of StarKist Tuna mascot "Charlie the Tuna" at the company cannery in Atu'u

The economy of American Samoa is dominated by grants from the U.S. Department of Interior. The tuna canning and fishing industries provide the majority of the GDP, although tourism is a promising developing sector. Economic activity is strongly linked to the US with which American Samoa conducts most of its commerce, although American Samoa does not treat the US as an external trade partner. Funding from the US government adds substantially to American Samoa's economic well-being. Attempts by the government to develop a larger and broader economy are restrained by Samoa's remote location, its limited transportation, and its devastating hurricanes. Hurricanes are relatively infrequent and although they sometimes cause substantial damage, the total number of deaths from hurricanes in the past 50 years is estimated to be fewer than five. Therefore, hurricanes are simply an inconvenience and certainly not the economic development curtailing events portrayed in many writings.

More than 90% of the land is communally owned. Tuna fishing and tuna processing plants are the backbone of the private sector, with canned tuna the primary export. Urban development has taken roots in Pago Pago Harbor where fisheries and its allied industries of canneries have been established. The largest Tuna processing plant in the world, known as StarKist, is located in Atu'u, across the bay from Fagatogo. In the harbor there is a workshop of the Marine Railways, which takes care of the maintenance and repair of fishing ships.

== Ecosystem ==
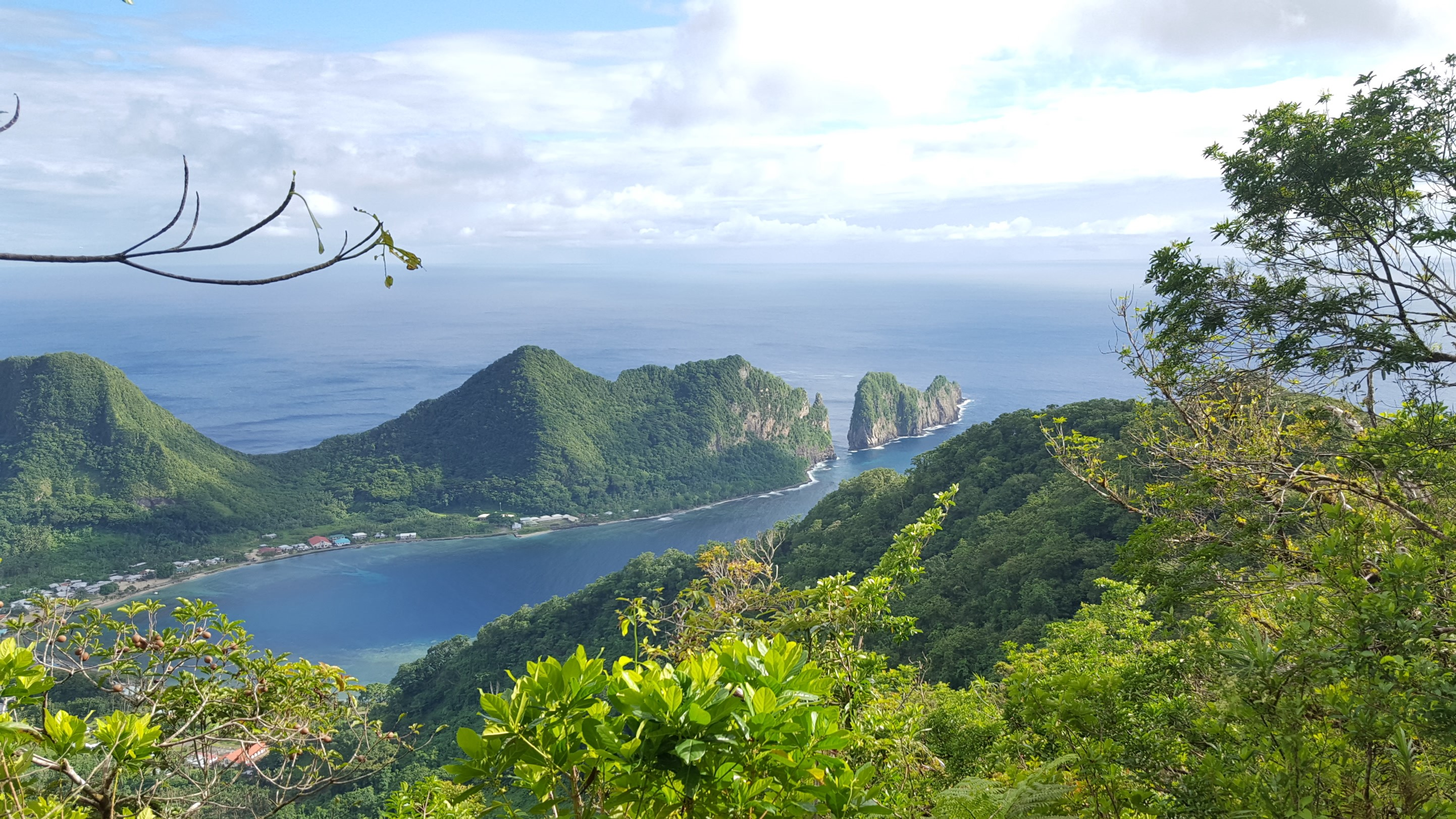
Vatia and Pola Island

The island has six terrestrial and three marine ecosystems. There are two protected areas in the island namely, the National Park covering an area of 2,000 hectares (4,900 acres) and the Fagatele Bay National Marine Sanctuary of 66 hectares (160 acres) area.

=== Flora ===
Flora in the island is dominated by lowland and montane rain forests. The lowland rain forest at elevation less than 300 m (980 ft) is dominated by Diospyros, Dysoxylum, Pometia and Syzygium species. The montane forest in the elevation range of 300–700 m (980–2,300 ft) consists of Dysoxylum, montane scrub, streams, bushes, mangroves, mangrove lagoons, reefs and submerged coral banks.

=== Fauna ===
There are 19 species of land snails in the island out of which 11 are endemic and four are in the threatened category. Mt. Matafao, which has many species of snails, has been researched from this angle since 1917; some of the endemic snails reported here are the Diastole matafaoi (endemic and may be extinct) and Samoana abbreviata (short Samoan tree snail, Partulidae). Achatina fulica (giant African land snail) introduced in 1975 is reported to have damaged gardens. Two different species of flying fox (bats) have also been found on the island (described under National Park).

Aquafauna

Hard corals recorded include 174 species of 48 genera and sub-genera.

Avifauna

The bird species recorded are under endemic category. These are: The Aplonis atrifuscus (Samoan starling) group; the Gymnomyza samoensis (black-breasted honeyeater) group; Halcyon recurvirostris (flat-billed kingfisher); Lalage sharpei (Samoan triller); Myiagra albiventris (white-vented flycatcher); Pachycephala flavifrons (yellow-fronted Samoan whistler); and Rhipidura nebulosa (Samoan fantail).

Four species of native doves and pigeons are also recorded in all the islands of Samoa. The four species are: Pacific imperial pigeon (Ducula pacifica), the crimson-crowned fruit dove (Ptilinopus porphyraceus), many-colored fruit dove (Ptiliopus persousii) and shy ground dove (Galicolumba stairi).

Butterflies are another category of avifauna in the island. The recorded species are: the Hypolimnas thompsoni and Papilio godeffroyi (butterfly).

=== National Park of American Samoa ===
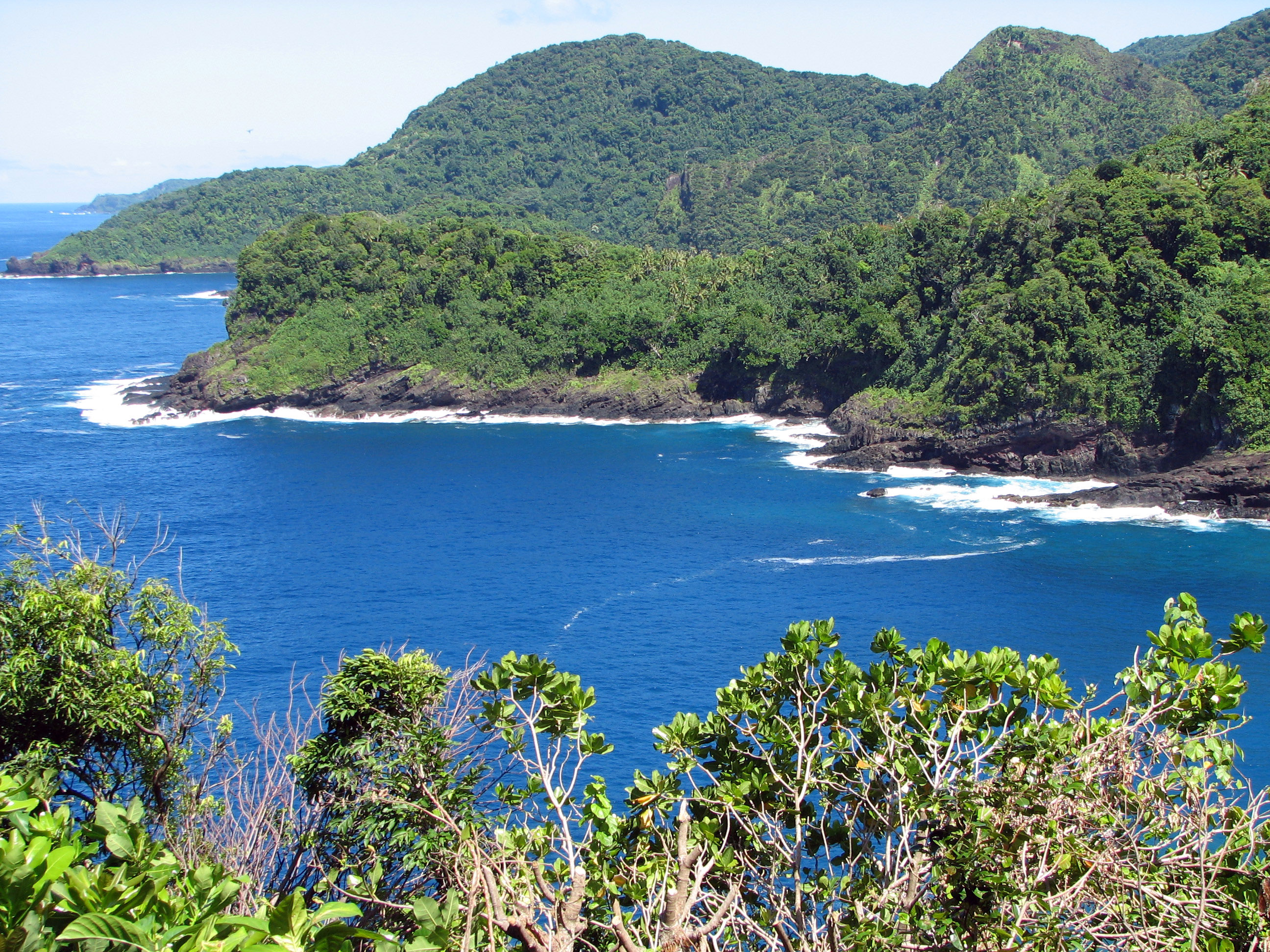
Amalu Bay in National park Service Area

National Park map of Tutuila Island

The National Park of American Samoa in Tutuila was established in 1988 for preserving its terrestrial and marine environment. It covers an area of 2,000 ha (4,900 acres) 14% of the island and is bound on the north coast between Fagasa and Afono villages. The Rainmaker pass is located within this park with its rainforests. The Amalau Valley between the Afono and Vatia villages in the park has many species of birds and animals. The most significant faunal species consists of the two species of the flying fox (bats), which the local Samoans consider as the protective guardian of the forest and also its people.

The two species of flying foxes (bats) protected in the park are: Pteropus samoensis (known locally as pe'a voa) meaning "fruit bat of the forests" and Pteropus tonganus locally called pe'afaunua, which means "fruit bat of settled lands"; The roosting place of Pteropus samoensis (with prominent light colored face with brown body) is the canopy of ridge top trees, which roost alone or in small groups and are active during day time with two feeding peaks, the Pteropus tonganus (with black colored face with seal brown body) species roost in large groups (100 or more in numbers in each group) in thick forest habitat, also sometimes seen close to villages. Both species have a wing span of 1 m (3 ft 3 in) at adulthood, and weigh about 500 grams.

The park which is divided into three zones has a network of hiking trails. The National Park Service (NPS) maintains good information system about these trails. One such trail goes up Mount ʻAlava, a high peak within the park rising to a height of 491 meters (1,611 feet). A TV tower exists on this mountain and also the ruins of a cable car station of a 1.8 km (1.1 mi) long cableway which once ran over Pago Pago Harbor to Solo hill in Utulei. (524m). This cableway, which was the only single-way cable in the world at that time built in 1965, was damaged when a Navy plane attempted to fly under it and was caught by one of the cables, on April 17, 1980, and was permanently put out of commission. The cableway was used to transport the TV technicians to the transmission station. The descent from the peak passes through lovely vistas of the lowlands of the park and the rain forests which abound in several bird species. Another ridge trail runs from Fagasa Pass over a length of 6.5 km (4.0 mi), goes through a very steep slope behind the rest fale (hurricane shelter), which is also negotiated through a stairway and further leads down to the serene Vatia village on the coral bay.

== Natural disasters ==
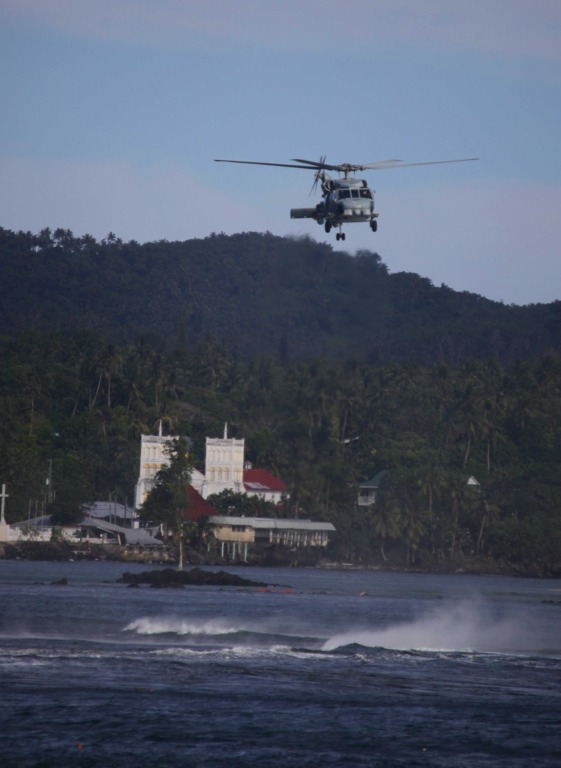
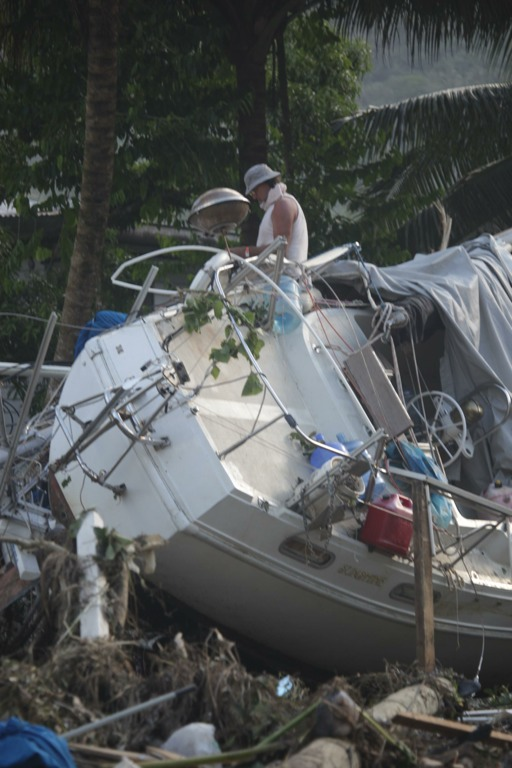
Left: U.N. Air Rescue Helicopter during rescue operation in Pago Pago. Right: Destruction to a boat due to Tsunami in Pago Pago.

Hurricanes or tropical cyclones have been frequently striking the Samoan Island for centuries. To monitor and give advance warning of the cyclones, several Observation stations have been established under the U.S. Federal Emergency Management Agency (FEMA), in American Samoa. After the first recorded hurricane (at least in modern times) hit the Samoan islands on February 10, 1966, which was declared a major disaster, "hurricane homes" called as "fale afa" have been built in the islands for people to take shelter during cyclonic storms. After the hurricane in 1966 the islands have witnessed many disasters due to heavy rains, hurricanes and drought; due to drought in 1974, due to floods, mudslides and landslides in 1979; and due to hurricanes in 1981, 1987, 1990, 1991 and 2004; and a tsunami in 2009.

The hurricane of December 4–13, 1991, was the worst disaster faced by entire group of Samoan Islands which was named "Hurricane Val," which caused immense damages to property in the American Samoa and Western Samoa. The Hurricane Val in comparison to past hurricanes, was very severe and the storm force had a wind velocity of over 100 knots or 166 km (103 mi)/hour. It was reported as the worst in 100 years in its intensity of wind force and the severity of the damage caused in the island. According to the history of the National Oceanic and Atmospheric Administration's (NOAA) American Samoa observatory, "Hurricane Val" struck the Tutuila Island from December 7 – 10th. The hurricane's eye passed over the southern end of the island with winds as high as 116 mi (187 km) recorded at the observatory. In the Fagatele Bay of the Tutuila Island where the Hurricane Val made a direct pass over Tutuila the coral reef was completely destroyed, a large strip of the coast was also eroded.

In response to this disaster, National Oceanic and Atmospheric Administration (NOAA) dispatched an assessment team to survey the damage to the reefs. Apart from the cable way which was severely damaged and went permanently out of commission, the TV tower at Utulei, one of the three TV channels, was completely damaged by Val, resulting in its cannibalization to maintain the two remaining channels. The Fagalele Boys School, which was one of the oldest European style buildings built in the middle of the 19th century on the west coast of the island in Leone village, was also destroyed by Hurricane Val.

== Places of historical interest ==
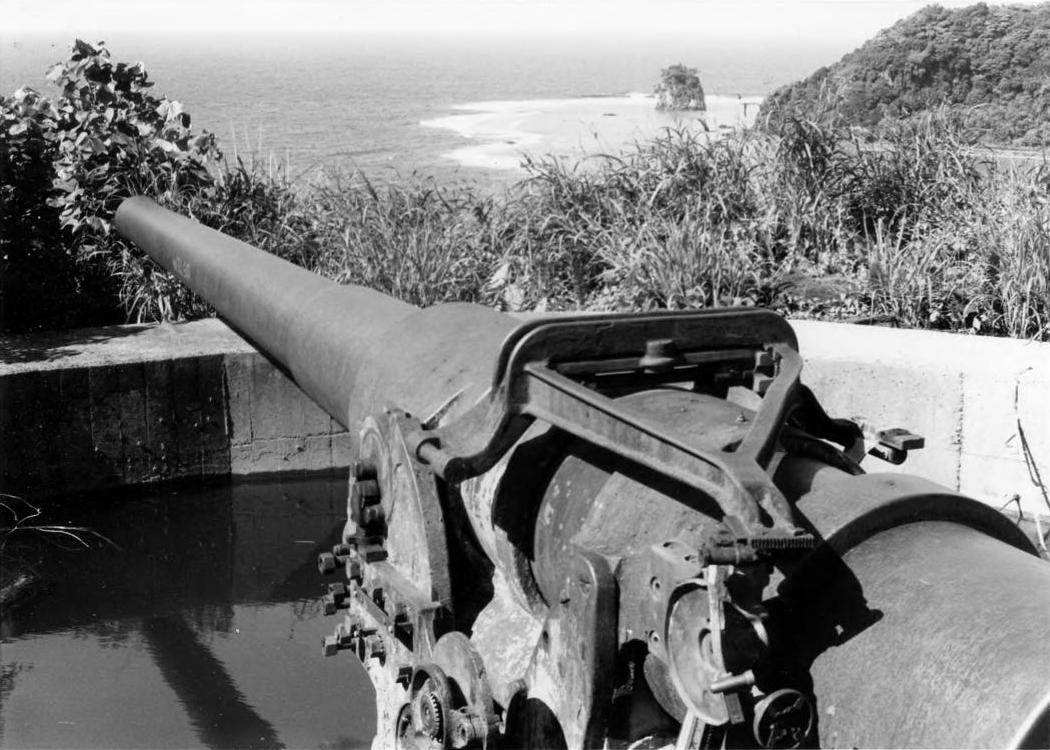
Blunts Point Battery overlooking Pago Pago

At Utulei, at Blunts Point there are two guns of World War II vintage dated to 1941, which are seen in the form of two metal tubes projecting from a wall. The guns are seen at two levels, the lower gun is above a green water tank. The second gun is located 200 m (660 ft) above the first gun above the ridge. Both guns are accessible through a staircase made of concrete. In addition, two more guns of identical dimensions are also seen fixed at the harbor mouth at a strategic location to create a cross fire. Concrete bunkers used during WWII are also seen at Pago Pago.

Notable buildings in Fagatogo are the Governor's Mansion (1903), Sadie's Restaurant where Somerset Maugham stayed in 1916 and wrote the short story "Rain" about former prostitute Sadie Thompson (that takes place in American Samoa), the Fono Building which is the state legislative building, the Jean P. Haydon Museum built in 1917, which was once the navy headquarters and Catholic Cathedral with painting of a Holy Family scene at the beach. Also seen are the Zion Church (1900) at Leone, the old capital of Tutuila and the monument in front of the church erected in honor of John Williams, the first missionary to visit Tutuila in 1832, the Radio Towers at Mount Olotele, the Massacre Bay in Aasu village where a monument has been installed in 1883 with stone cross to honor of the 11 French sailors only who were members of the Astrolabe and Boussole ships during the La Parouse expedition who were killed by the local Samoans in a clash on December 11, 1787; 11 Chinese and 39 Samoans also died in this conflict but are not mentioned in the honor list.

At the defunct cable car terminal on the Solo Hill in Utulei there is a monument built in honor of the six US Navy personnel who died in the plane crash which occurred as a result of hitting the cableway and crashed into the Rainmaker Hotel; two tourists staying in the hotel also died in the crash.

== See also ==
- United States Naval Station Tutuila
- American Samoa Community College
- Rainmaker Mountain
