= Maʻopūtasi County =

Coordinates: 14°16′46″S 170°42′02″W

- County
- County of Maoputasi
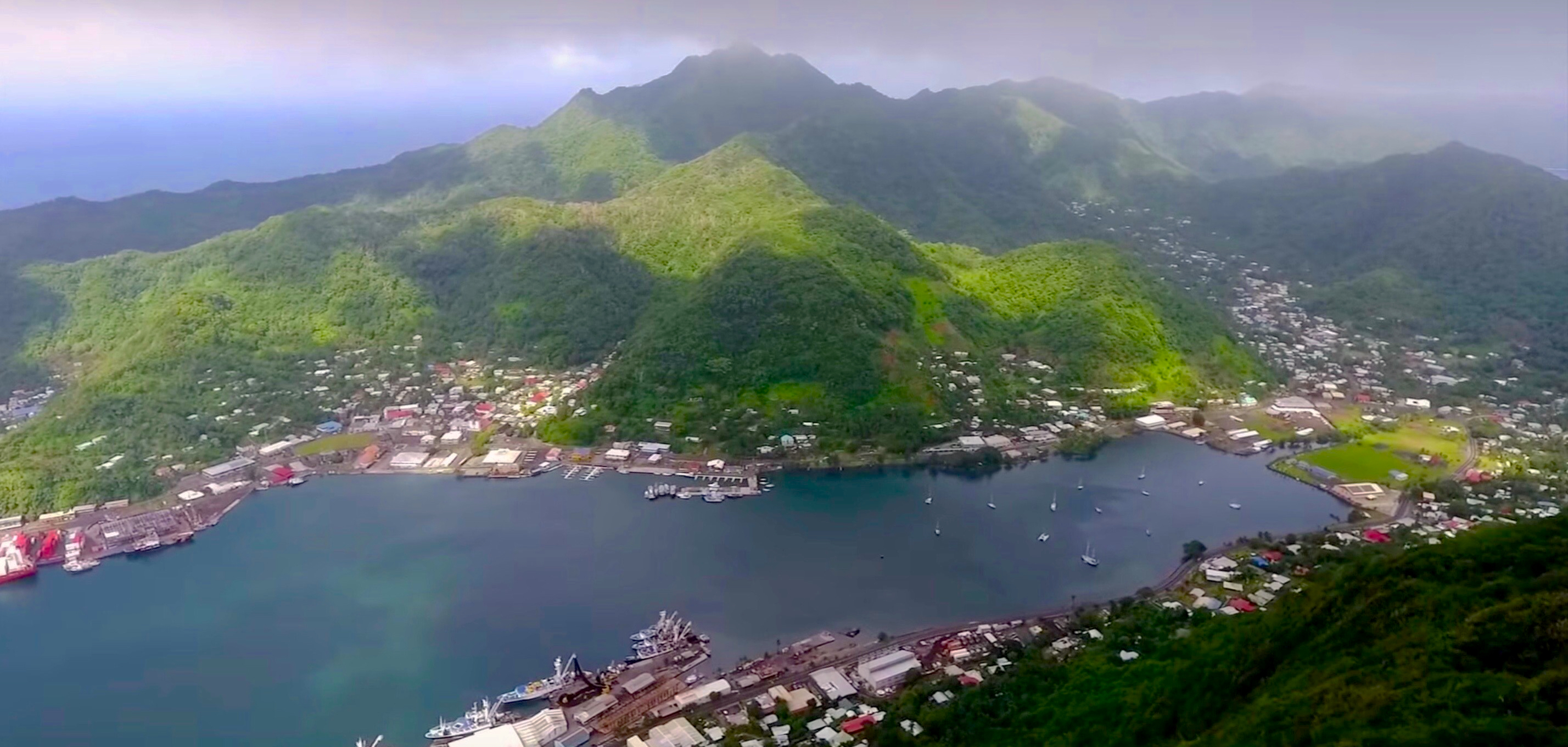
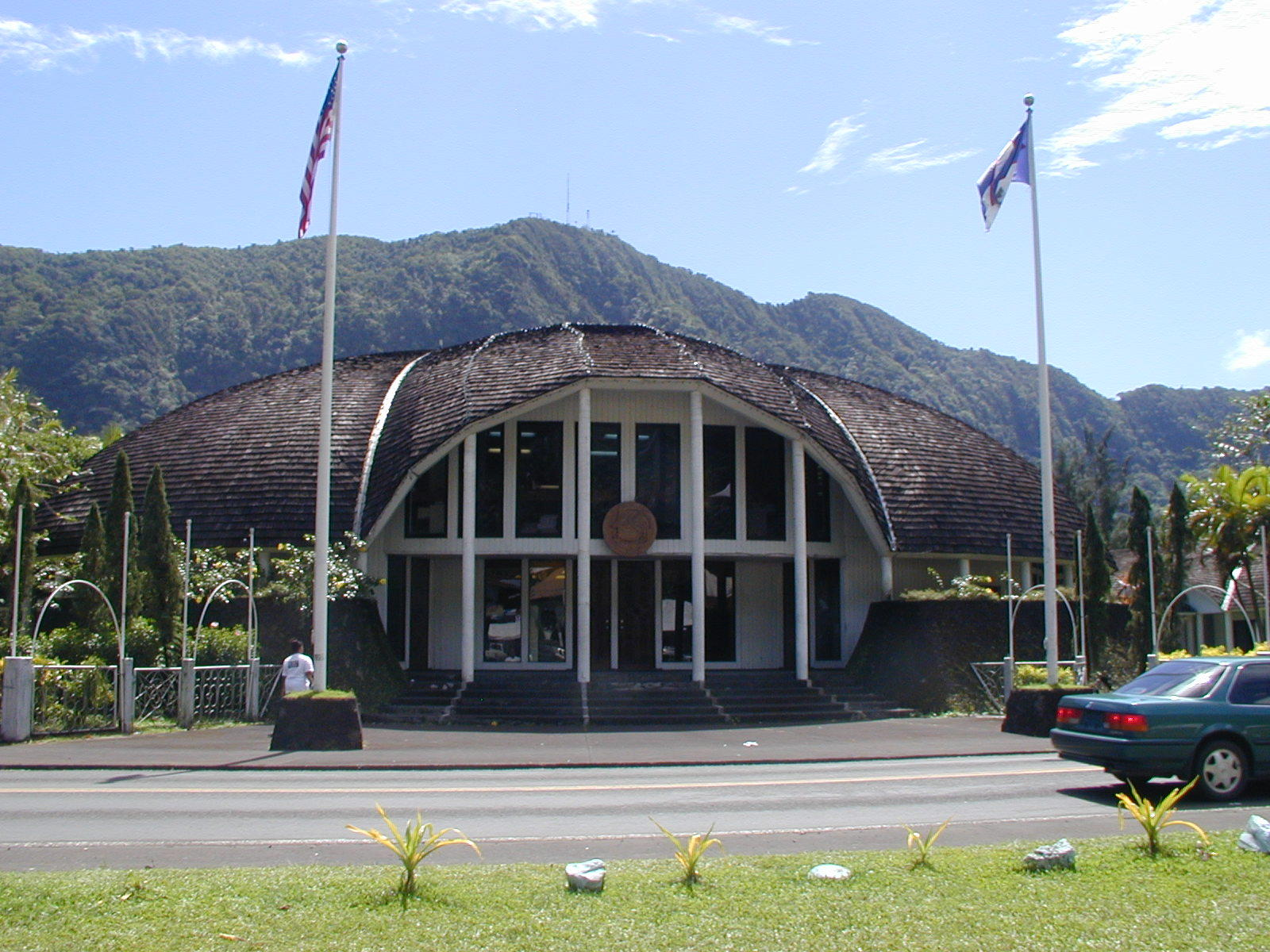
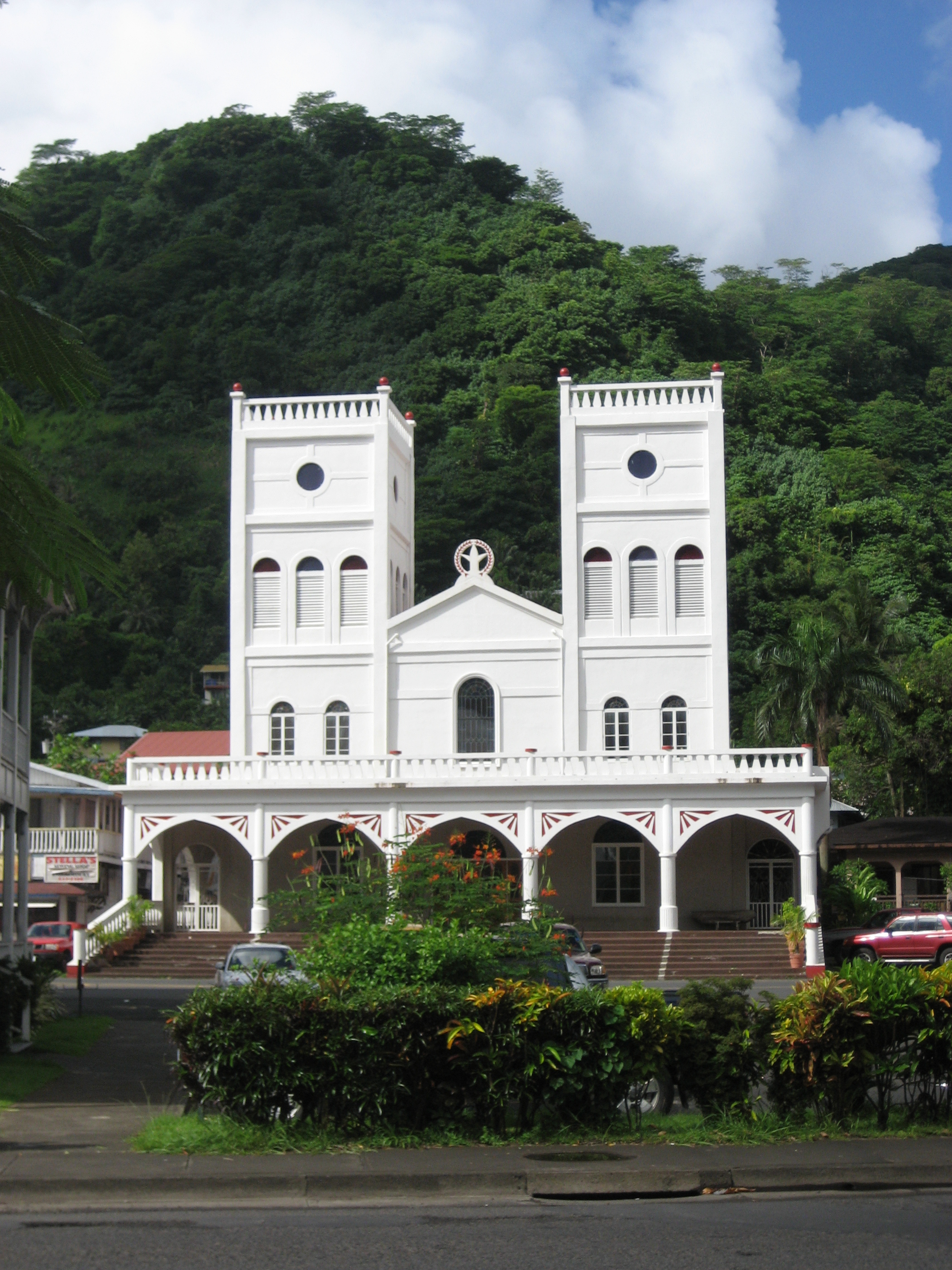
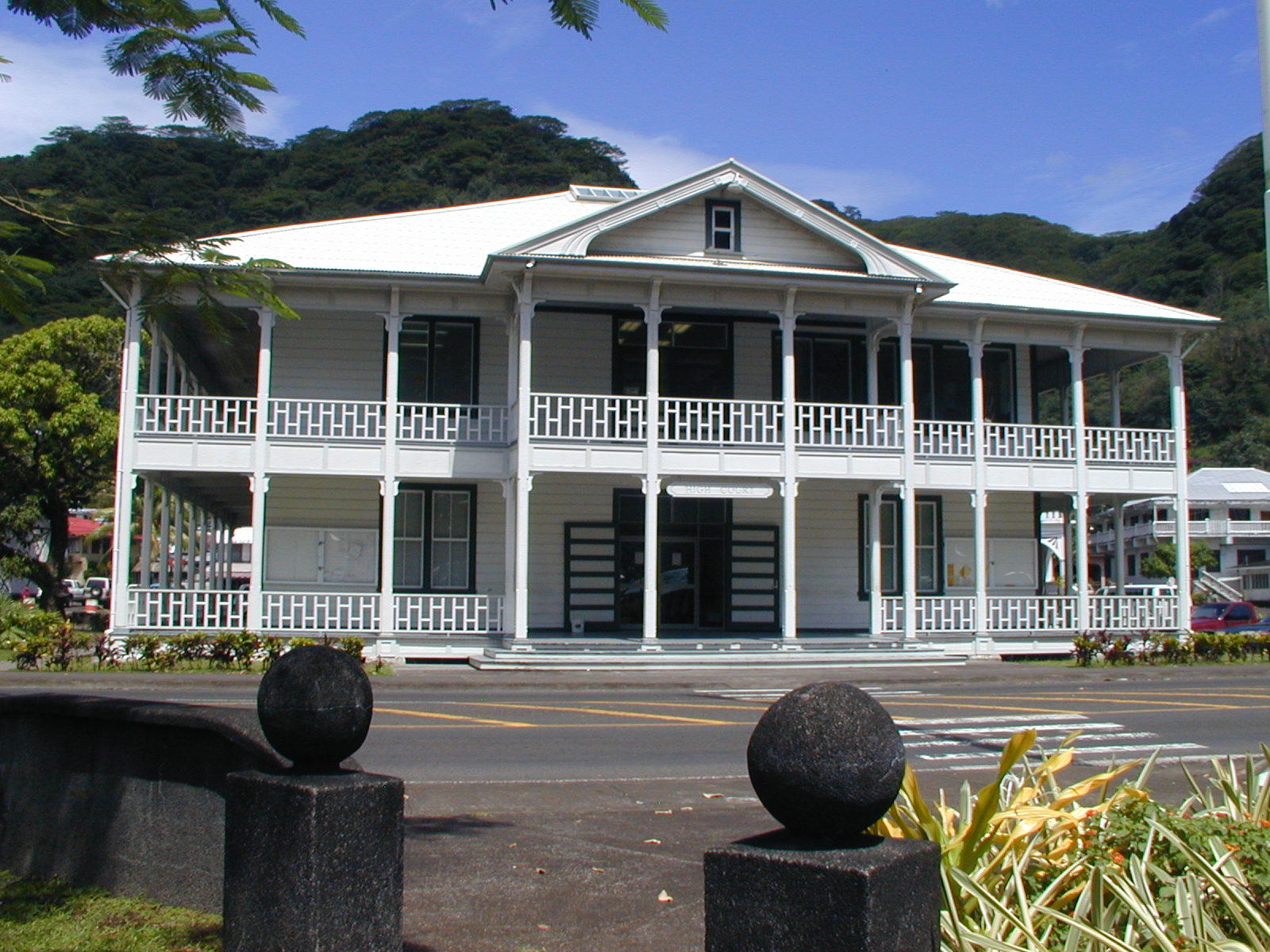
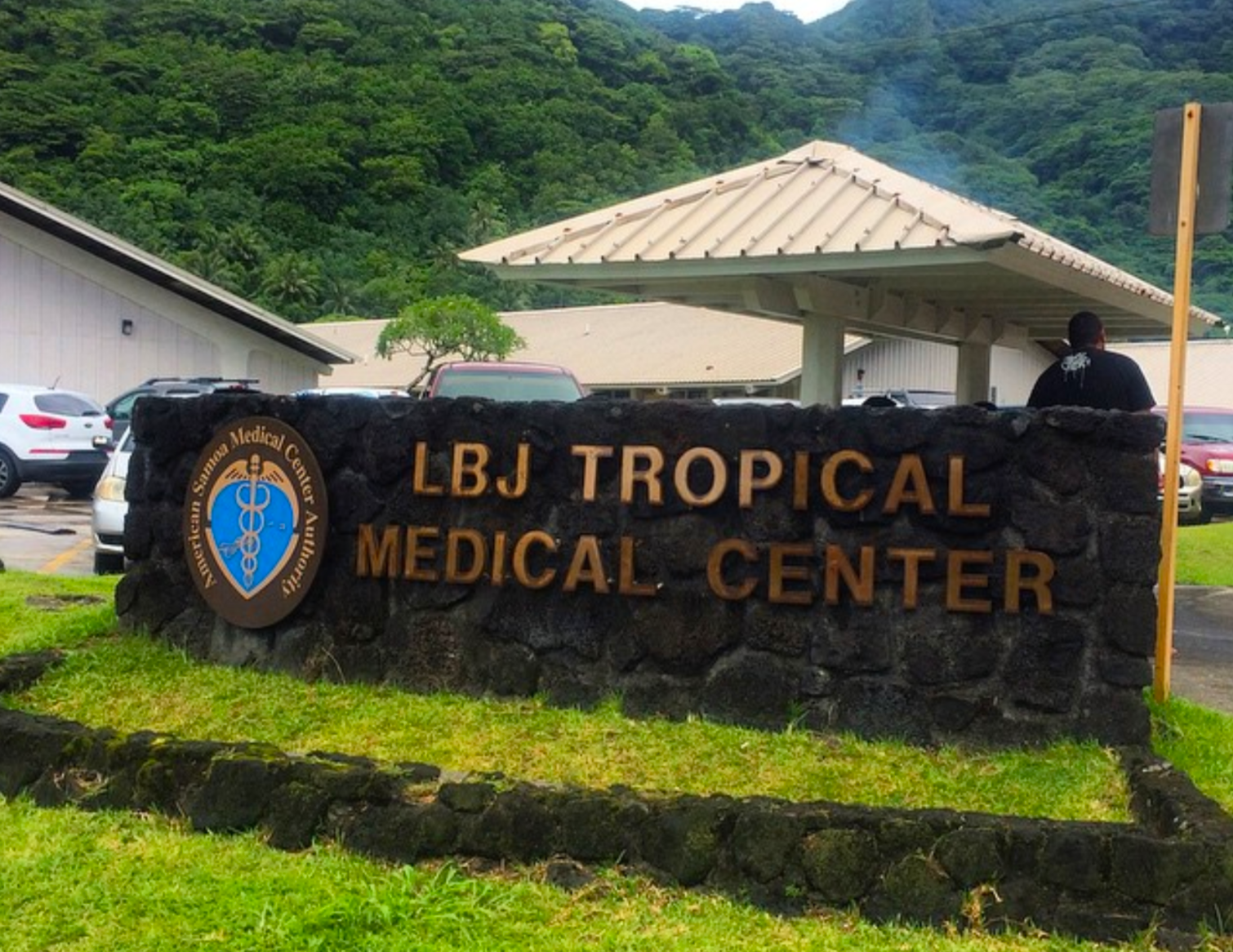
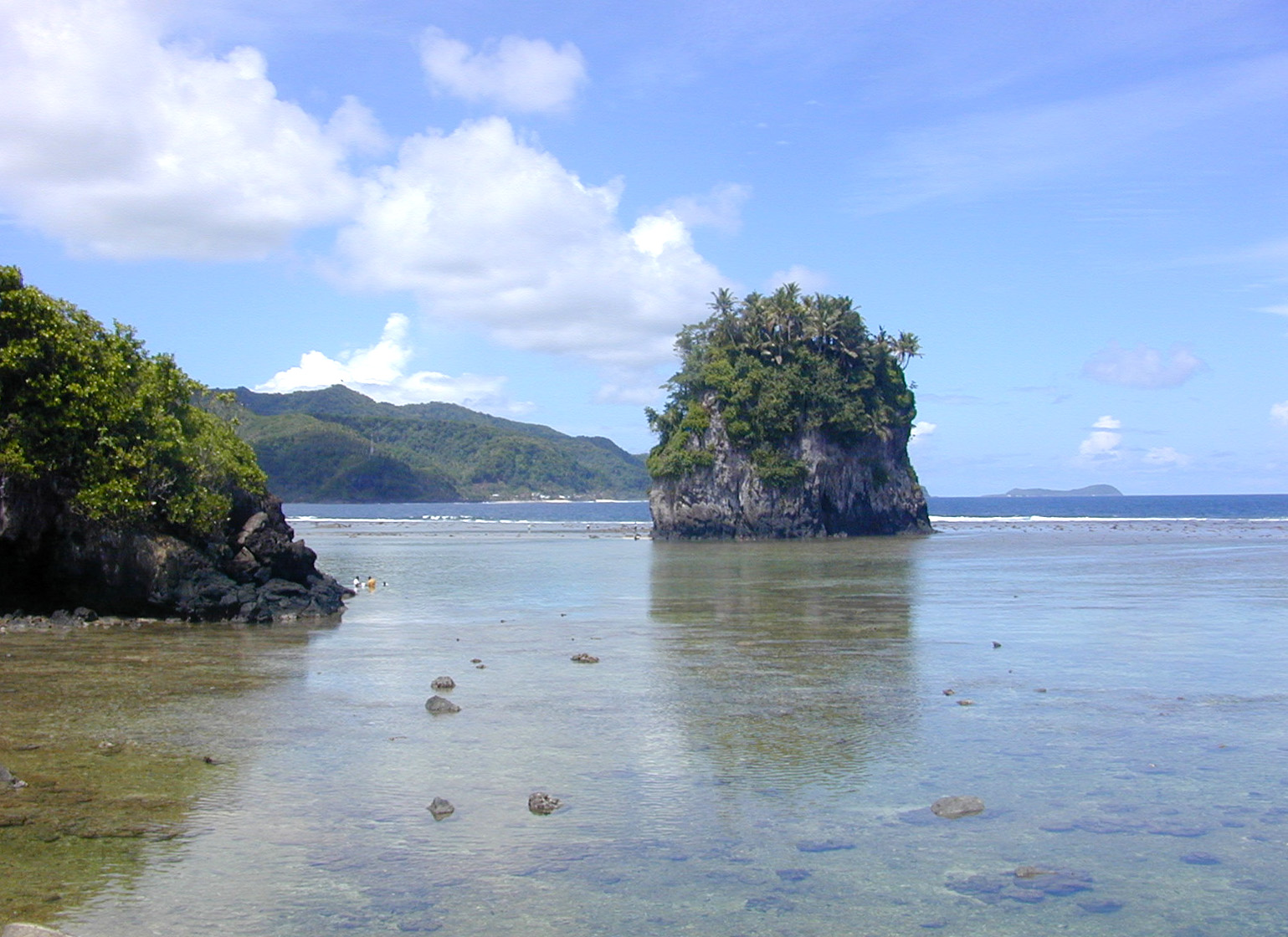
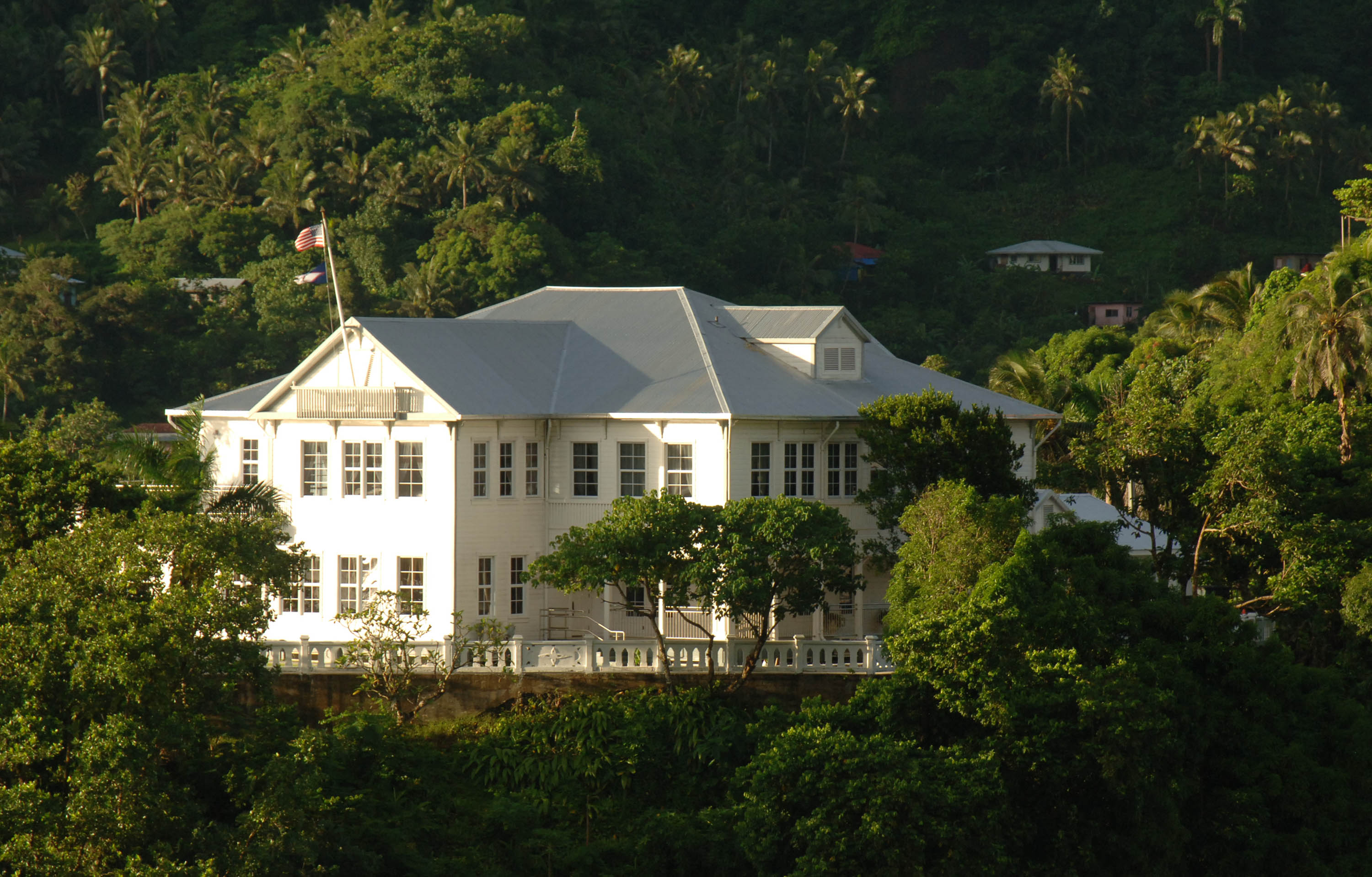
- Pago Pago Harbor American Samoa Fono Congregational Christian Church in Fagatogo High Court of American Samoa LBJ Tropical Medical Center Fatu Rock Government House

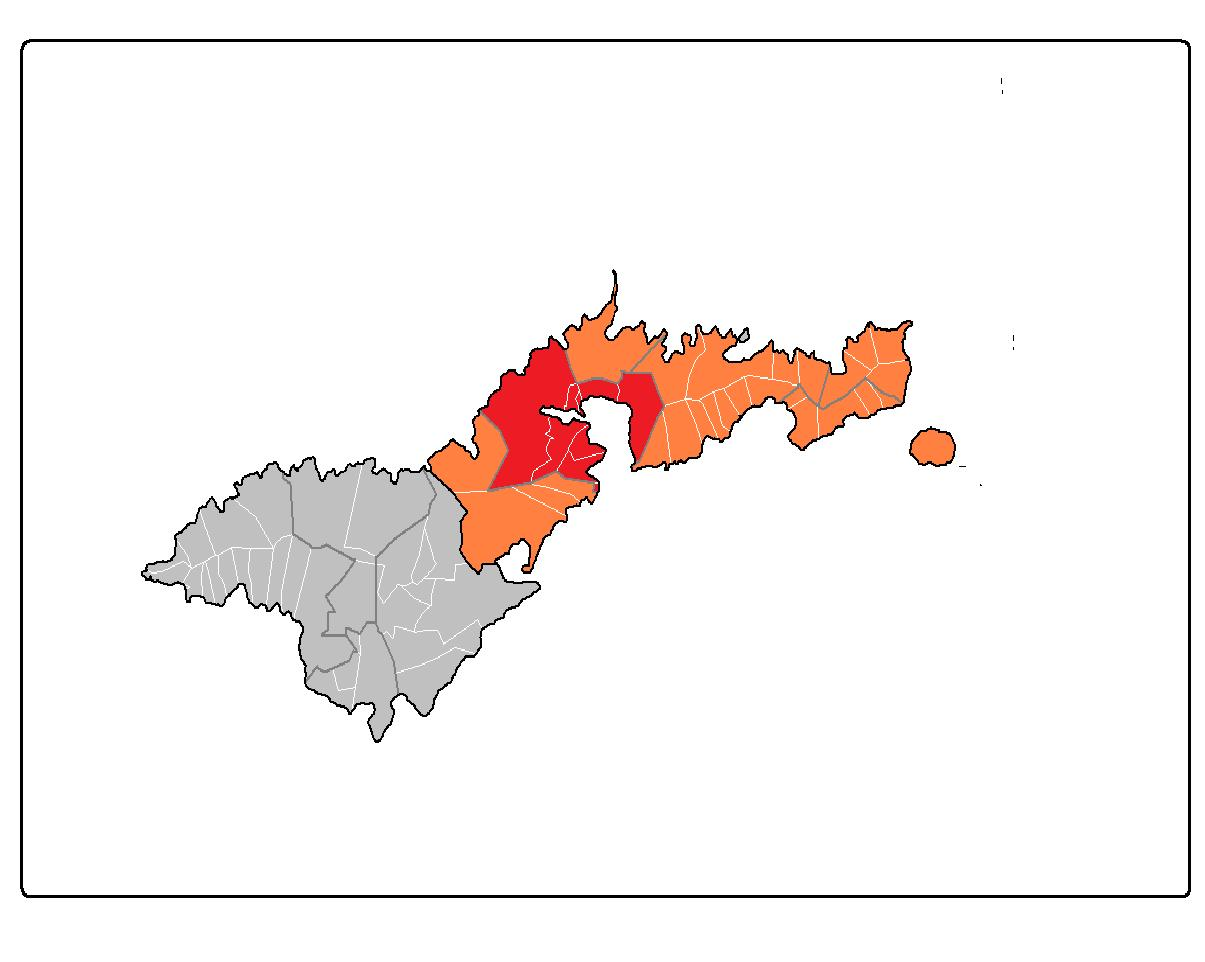
- Map of Tutuila where Maʻopūtasi County is highlighted in red
- Country: United States
- Territory: American Samoa
- Island: Tutuila
- District: Eastern
- Named for: O le Ma'upūtasi ("The Single Chief’s House")
- County seat: Pago Pago
- Largest city: Pago Pago

Area
  - Total: 6.65 sq mi (17.2 km^{2})
- Highest elevation: 2,142 ft (653 m)

Population (2020)
  - Total: 8,568
  - Estimate (2015): 11,052
  - Density: 1,290/sq mi (497/km^{2})
- Time zone: UTC−11 (Pacific Time Zone)
- ZIP code: 96799
- Area code: +1 684

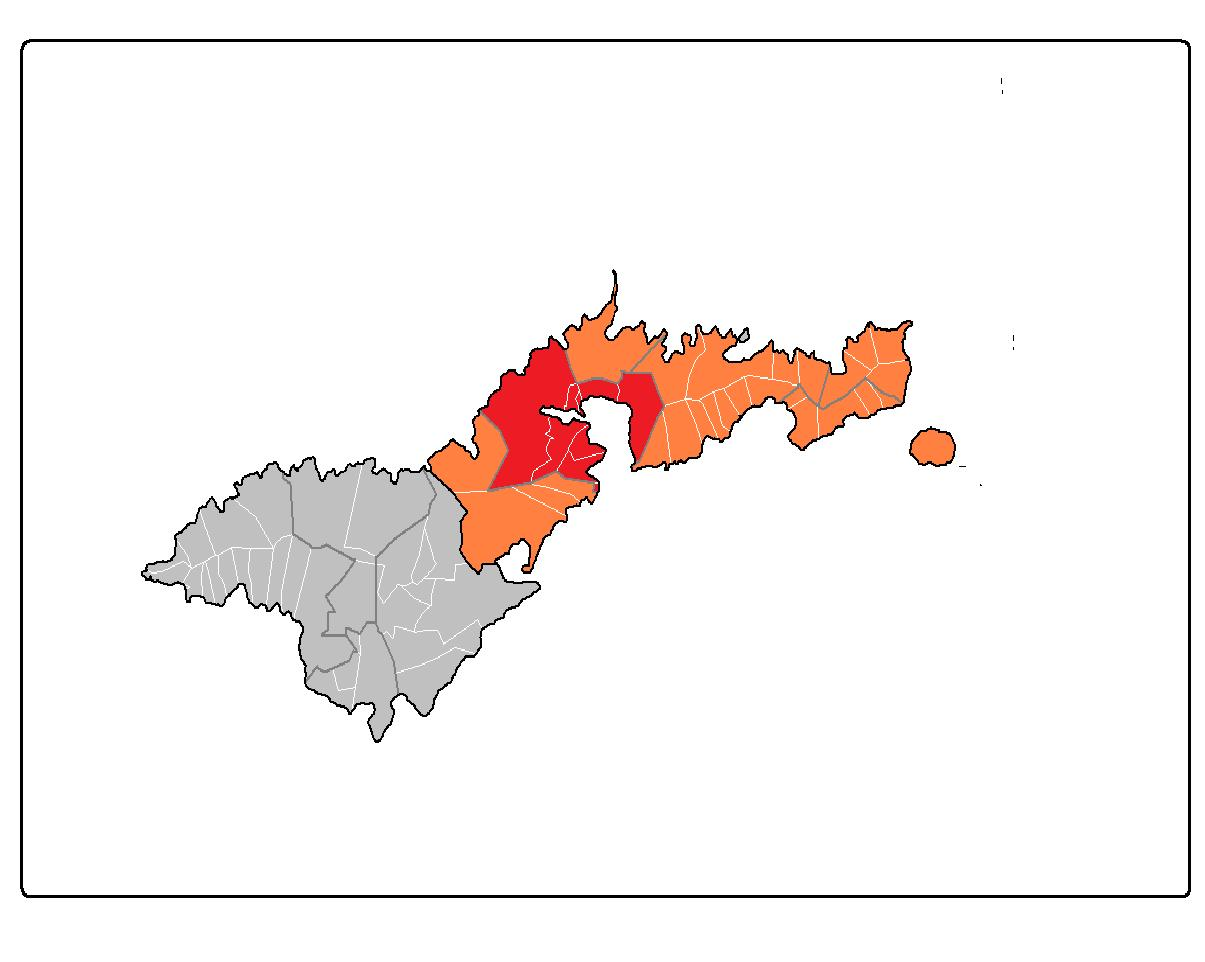
Map of Tutuila where Maʻopūtasi County is highlighted in red, while the Eastern District is marked in orange.

Maʻopūtasi County is located in the Eastern District of Tutuila Island in American Samoa. Maʻopūtasi County comprises the capital of Pago Pago and its harbor, as well as surrounding villages. It was home to 11,695 residents as of 2000. Maʻopūtasi County is 6.69 square miles (17.3 km^{2}) The county has a 7.42-mile (11.94 km) shoreline which includes Pago Pago Bay.

Maʻopūtasi County makes up all villages in the Pago Pago Bay Area from Aua to Fatumafuti. Besides Pago Pago, it is home to the following villages: Anua (2010 pop. 18), Atu’u (pop. 359), Aua (pop. 2,077), Faga'alu (pop. 910), Fagatogo (pop. 1,737), Fatumafuti (pop. 113), Leloaloa (pop. 448), Satala (pop. 297), and Utulei (pop. 684).

The county is represented by three senators in the American Samoa Senate, and five representatives in the House of Representatives, more than any other county. Following the 2018 midterm elections, the county is currently represented by the following five members in the House of Representatives: Vailoata Eteuati Amituana’i, Vailiuama Steve Leasiolagi, Vesiai Poyer Samuelu, Vaetasi Tuumolimoli Moliga, and Faimealelei Anthony Allen.

== Etymology ==
Maʻopūtasi translates to “the only house of chiefs”. Pago Pago has been called O le Maputasi ("The Single Chief’s House") in compliment to the Mauga, who lived at Gagamoe and was the senior to all the other chiefs in the area.

In English, Maʻopūtasi County is occasionally spelled as Maoputasi or Maputasi.

The official county name was changed from Ma’uputasi County to Maʻoputasi County following the 2022 American Samoan constitutional referendum.

== History ==
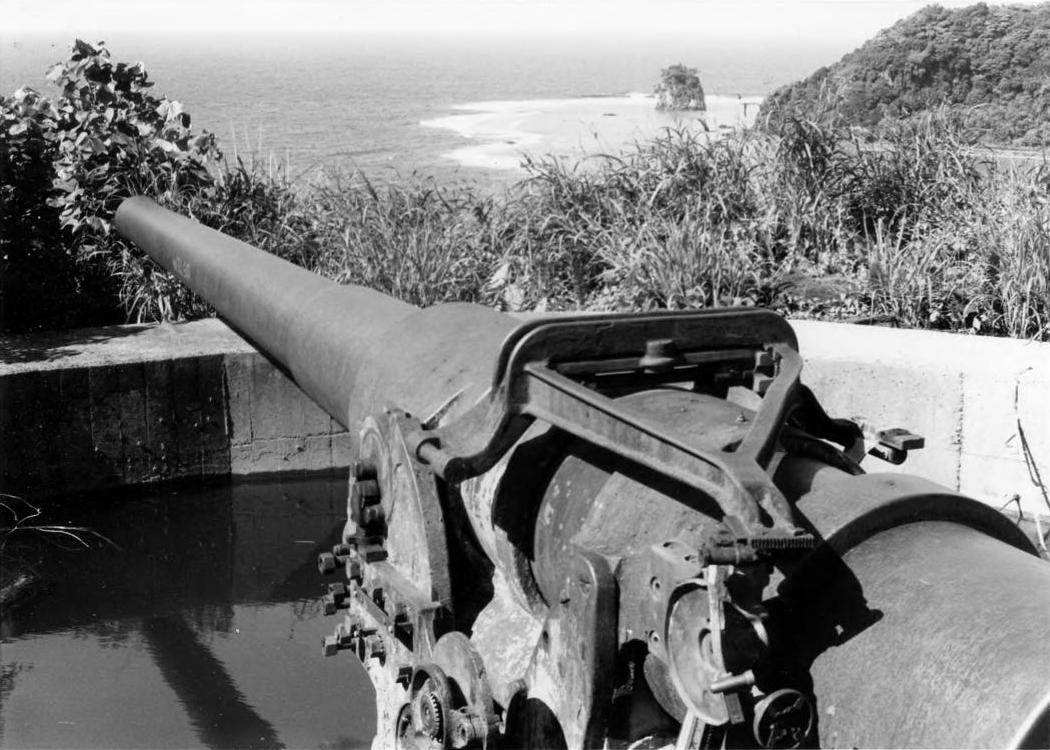
Guns were emplaced at Blunt's- and Braker's Points in 1940–42, covering Pago Pago Harbor.

At the time of the Tuʻi Tonga Empire, the Tongans had established themselves in this area but were eventually driven off by chief Fua’autoa of Pago Pago in 1250. During the Tongan rule, political opponents and defeated Samoan warriors were exiled to Pago Pago. Pago Pago and its surrounding settlements effectively functioned as a Samoan penal colony.

In earlier times, villages were often built inland to shield inhabitants from seaborne marauders. Evidence of such a settlement can still be seen in the ruins on the mountainside behind Pago Pago (“Old Pago Pago”). Later, however, most villages - including Pago Pago - were moved down to the seashore.

In the summer of 1892, a disturbance broke out around Pago Pago Bay due to local rivalries. Mauga Lei chose to spend most of his time in Upolu Island, leaving the Pago Pago area without its natural leadership. The village of Pago Pago remained loyal, but neighboring Fagatogo joined with Aua village in an attempt to oust Mauga Lei in favor of a new titleholder. Pago Pago and the transmontane village of Fagasa demanded and received the surrender of the pretender. Fagatogans and Auans embarked in their boats and set out for Pago Pago, and when they were closing in on the village, they were met by bullets and forced to retreat. Houses were burned in Aua and Fagatogo, and women and children from Aua took refuge at the Roman Catholic Mission at Lepua.

In 1900, Mauga Moi Moi signed the Treaty of Cession of Tutuila and became the county’s chieftain, a position which also made him District Governor of the Eastern District. As the highest-ranking chief of Pago Pago, Governor Benjamin Franklin Tilley relied heavily on his leadership to garner Samoan support for the new U.S. administration. Mauga Moi Moi served as District Governor of the Eastern District for the first 35 years of U.S. rule, from 1900 to 1935. In 1920, he initiated the Mau movement.

Following the death of elder statesman Mauga Moi Moi in 1935, the high chiefly title became vacant along with the county's chieftainship and the district's governorship. When the Mauga aiga could not agree upon a successor, the Governor had to fill administrative posts and named High Chief Lei’ato to be the district's governor. He decided to try free, “American-style” elections for the post of county chief, however, Aua village declined to take any part in such proceedings. In the fa'aSāmoa, Utulei and Fagatogo villages voted for the Mailo, but each of the other county villages voted for its own village chiefs. Five years later, when the Mauga aiga chose Sialega Palepoi to be their matai, and hence High Chief of Maputasi County, the county chieftainship passed naturally into his hands.

In 1948, Governor Vernon Huber leased land on the north shore of Pago Pago Bay to Island Packers, Inc. for the establishment of a tuna cannery. The company planned to fish in the Fiji region and ship the catch back to Pago Pago for processing. The venture, however, collapsed when fishermen proved unable to secure tuna in commercially viable quantities.

In 1953, Mabel Reid of Pago Pago became the first woman elected to the American Samoa House of Representatives, representing Maʻopūtasi County.

The 2009 Samoa earthquake and tsunami did major structural damage to the port facility in Fagatogo and elsewhere in the county.

== Demographics ==
Historical population
Year	Pop.	±%
1912	1,264	—
1920	1,701	+34.6%
1930	2,559	+50.4%
1940	3,361	+31.3%
1950	5,467	+62.7%
1960	5,340	−2.3%
1970	7,886	+47.7%
1980	8,495	+7.7%
1990	10,640	+25.3%
2000	11,695	+9.9%
2010	10,299	−11.9%
2020	8,568	−16.8%
U.S. Decennial Census

Ma'oputasi County was first recorded beginning with the 1912 special census. Regular decennial censuses were taken beginning in 1920. From 1912 to 1970, it was reported as "Mauputasi County."

With the exception of Fatumafuti village, Maʻopūtasi County as a whole and all its villages experienced a population decline from 2000 to 2010. In 2010, the county was home to 10,299 residents, down from 11,695 recorded at the 2000 U.S. census. Pago Pago’s population decreased 14.5 percent, Fagatogo’s population by 17.1 percent, and Utulei’s population by 15.2 percent. The population of the Eastern District decreased from 23,441 residents recorded at the 2000 U.S. Census, down to 23,030 residents as of the 2010 U.S. census.

Maʻopūtasi County had a 2015 population of 11,052 residents, according to the 2015 Household Income and Expenditure Survey (HIES) by the Commerce Department. It is the second-most populated county (after Tualauta County) and was home to 1,999 housing units as of the 2010 U.S. census, down from 2,031 recorded at the 2000 U.S. census. It had the second-highest number of registered voters in 2016, only surpassed by Tualauta County. However, during the 2016 elections, more votes were cast in Maʻopūtasi County than any other county. There were 3,507 registered voters in Maʻopūtasi County as of 2016: 1,911 females and 1,596 males.

Population change
	2000 U.S. census	2010 U.S. census
Maʻopūtasi County	11,695	10,299
Anua	265	18
Atu'u	413	359
Aua	2,193	2,077
Faga'alu	1,006	910
Fagatogo	2,096	1,737
Fatumafuti	103	113
Leloaloa	534	448
Pago Pago (village)	4,278	3,656
Satala	-	297
Utulei	807	684

== Geography ==
=== Greater Pago Pago Area ===
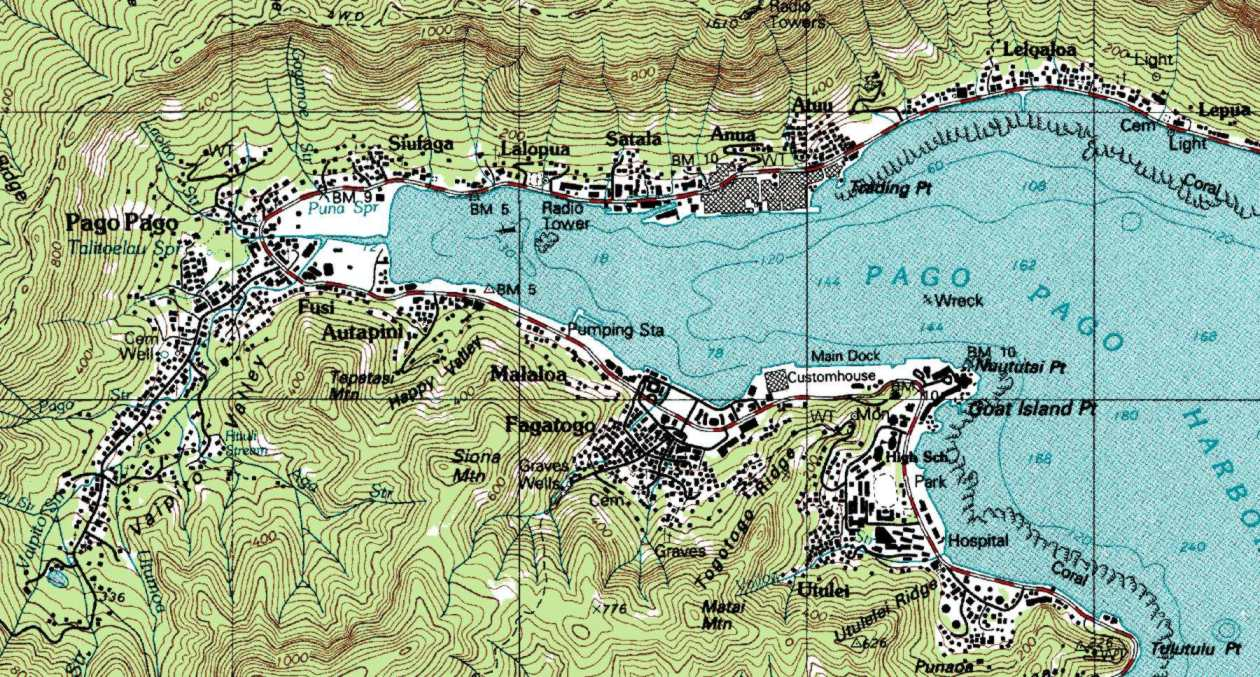
Map of Pago Pago Bay.

The county is home to the Greater Pago Pago Area, the seat of the capital, comprising several villages that stretch along Pago Pago Harbor. Among these villages are Utulei — American Samoa's executive capital and residence of the Governor — and Fagatogo, which serves as the legislative and judicial capital. It also encompasses the village of Pago Pago proper, recognized as the de facto capital of American Samoa. The area comprises the villages of Utulei, Fagatogo, Malaloa, Satala, Anua, and Pago Pago proper.

Originally named O le Fagaloa (“The Long Bay”), the area was also referred to as O le Maʻopūtasi, in honor of the Mauga who resided at Gagamoe and ranked senior to other local chiefs. Over time, Maʻopūtasi replaced Fagaloa and became the county’s official name. The villages in the Pago Pago Bay Area are now collectively referred to as Maʻopūtasi (“The Only House of Chiefs”), which also includes villages such as Aua, Leloaloa, and Fagaʻalu.

== Landmarks ==
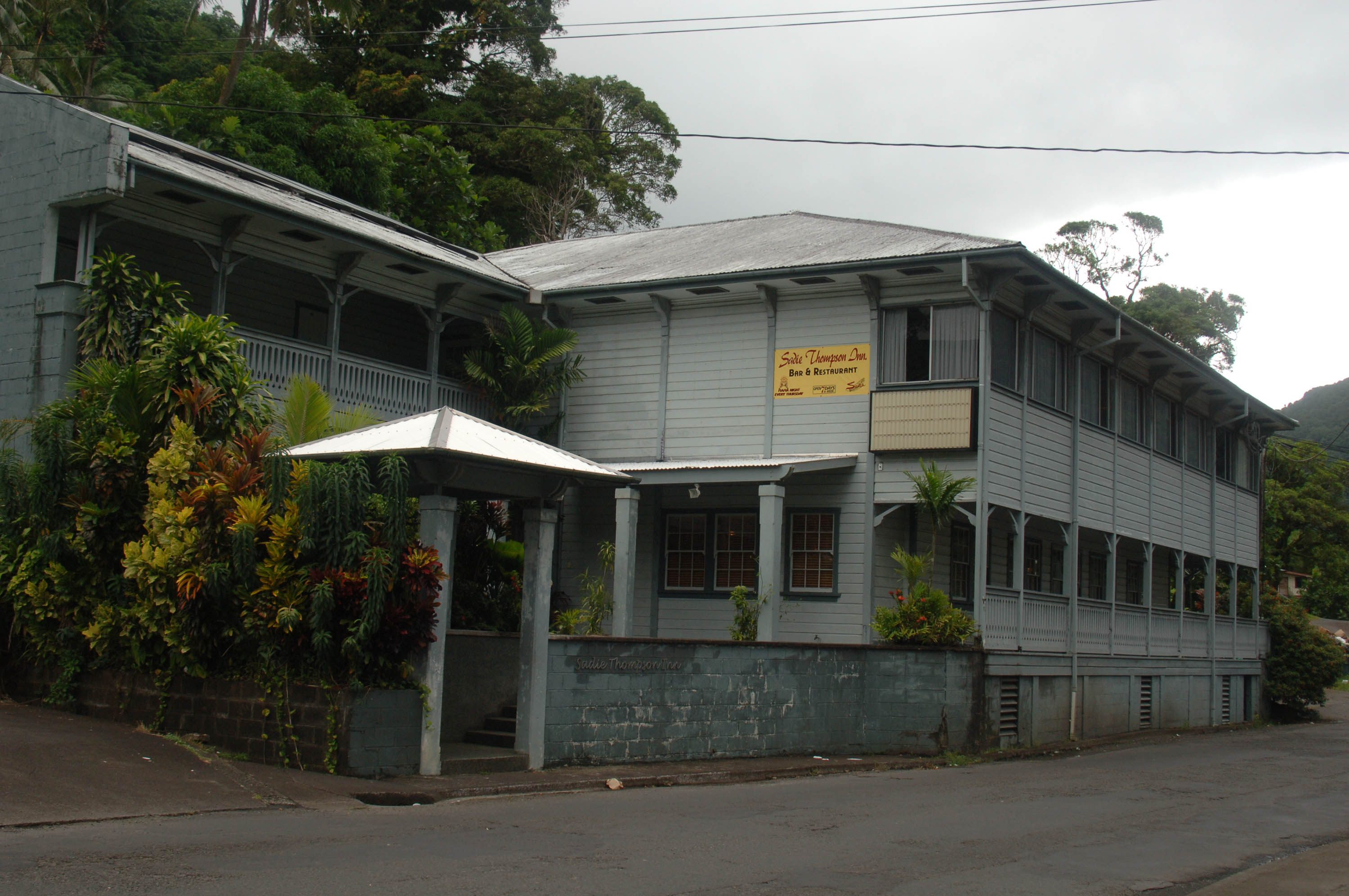
English author W. Somerset Maugham stayed at Sadie Thompson Inn during his 6-week visit to Pago Pago in 1916.

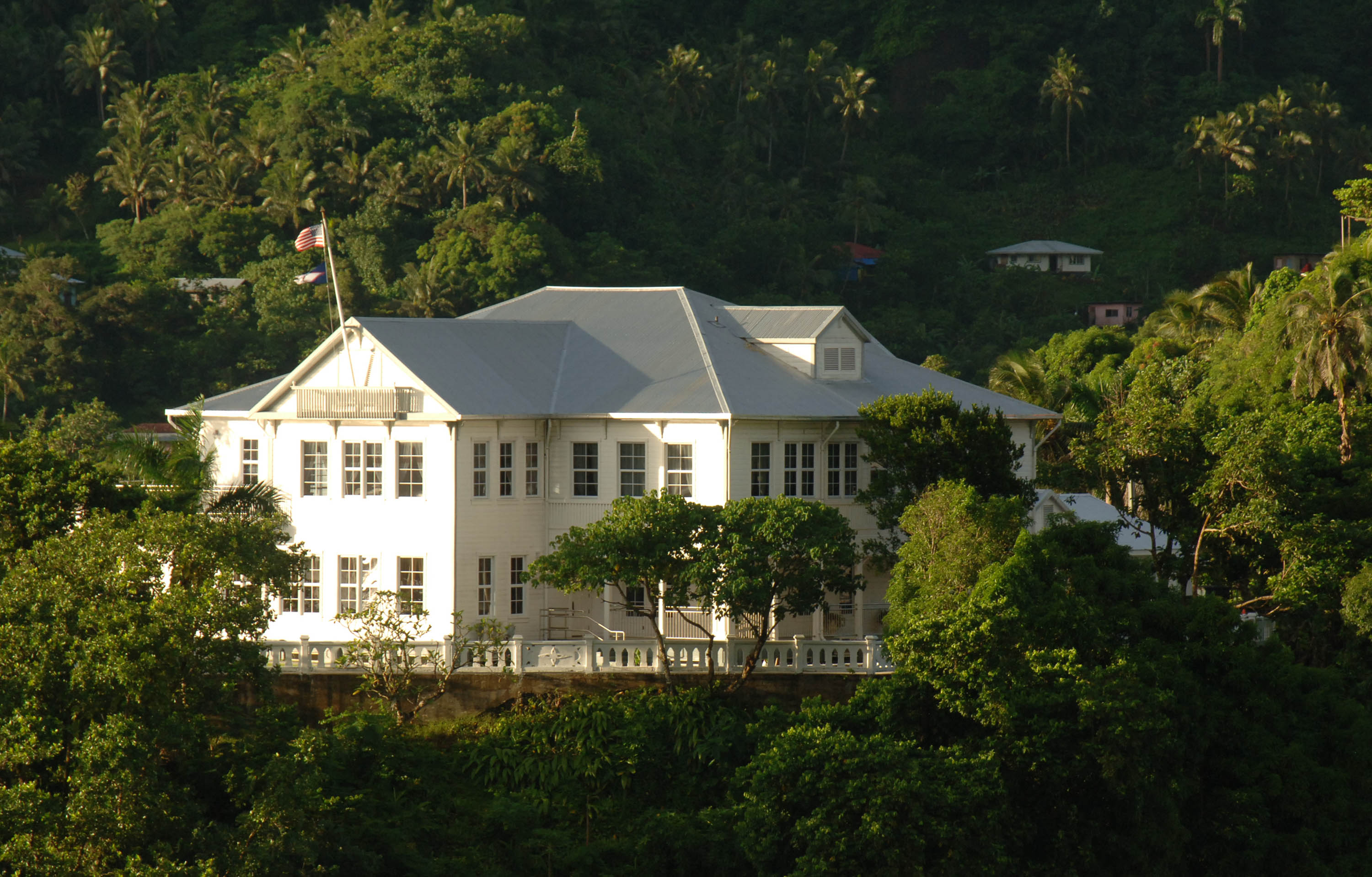
Government House in the Togotogo Ridge appears on the National Register of Historic Places.

- American Samoa Fono, the American Samoa legislature in Fagatogo
- Blunts Point Battery, National Historic Landmark on Matautu Ridge in Utulei
- Breakers Point Naval Guns, World War II-era defensive fortification, listed on the National Register of Historic Places
- Church of the Sacred Heart, in Anua
- Co-Cathedral of St. Joseph the Worker, the Roman Catholic cathedral of American Samoa, in Fagatogo
- Courthouse of American Samoa, in Utulei, listed on the U.S. National Register of Historic Places
- Fagatogo Market, a marketplace in downtown Fagatogo
- Fagatogo Square Shopping Center, 12,000 sq. ft. retail- and commercial center
- Feleti Barstow Public Library, central public library for American Samoa, in Utulei
- Flowerpot Rock, national landmark by Fatumafuti
- Governor H. Rex Lee Auditorium ("Turtle House"), in Utulei, listed on the U.S. National Register of Historic Places
- Government House, historic government building on the grounds of the former Naval Station Tutuila in Pago Pago
- Jean P. Haydon Museum, a museum in Fagatogo listed on the U.S. National Register of Historic Places
- Lyndon B. Johnson Tropical Medical Center, only hospital in American Samoa, in Faga'alu
- Michael J. Kirwan Educational Television Center, in Utulei, listed on the U.S. National Register of Historic Places
- National Park of American Samoa
- Navy Building 38, in Fagatogo, listed on the U.S. National Register of Historic Places
- Rainmaker Hotel, former luxury hotel in Utulei
- Rainmaker Mountain, designated National Natural Landmark
- Sadie Thompson Inn, Fagatogo hotel listed on the U.S. National Register of Historic Places
- Tauese PF Sunia Ocean Center, visitor center for National Marine Sanctuary of American Samoa
- U.S. Naval Station Tutuila Historic District, in Fagatogo
- Utulei Beach Park, park in Utulei
