= Fagatogo Market =

Fagatogo Market is a market centred in the Fagatogo area of Pago Pago, the capital of American Samoa. It opened in 2010 for farmers and fishermen to sell fruits, vegetables and fish. Souvenirs are sold among live entertainment here when cruise ships are in town. It lies in front of Pago Pago's main bus terminal. Nearby are Fagatogo Square Shopping Mall. Mount 'Alava, the canneries in Atu'u, Rainmaker Mountain and Pago Pago Harbor.
