= Fatumafuti, American Samoa =

Fatu-ma-futi
- Village
- Location within American Samoa
- Coordinates: 14°18′5″S 170°40′38″W
- Country: United States
- Territory: American Samoa
- County: Maoputasi
- Named for: Fatu-Ma-Futi

Area
  - Total: 0.039 sq mi (0.102 km^{2})

Population (2020)
  - Total: 72
  - Density: 1,800/sq mi (710/km^{2})

Fatu-ma-futi is a village in central Tutuila Island, American Samoa. It is located at the easternmost point of the entrance to Pago Pago Harbor, south of Pago Pago. Flowerpot Rock, also known as Fatu Rock, is found along the highway in Fatumafuti. Legend says Fatu and Futi (two offshore islets) were lovers living in the Manu’a Islands. They wanted to get married but were forbidden to do so. The couple sailed from Savai'i (Samoa), looking for Tutuila Island; their canoe sank, and the pair were transformed into these tree-topped islands.

== Etymology ==
The name Fatu-ma-Futi originates from two basalt islets offshore (Fatu Rock), believed to represent male and female figures in local legends. These oral traditions emphasize the cultural significance of the site within the Samoan community.

== History ==
Initial settlement at Fatu-ma-Futi is estimated to have occurred between 1600 and 1300 years ago. Radiocarbon dating and stratigraphic analysis suggest that the site underwent a transition from episodic use to permanent habitation. This timeline coincides with a period of relative sea-level stabilization, which created new coastal terraces suitable for human activity. Archaeological findings include structural features, burials, molluscan middens, and evidence of large-scale basalt tool production, likely tied to the Tutuila basalt export industry.

During World War II, the U.S. military established installations in Fatumafuti, which included a warehouse complex featuring eight storage units. Among these, two facilities were specifically designated for storing medical supplies.

Fatu-ma-Futi Beach transitioned from a public access beach to a privately managed site on July 1, 2016. The Mauga family, who claim ownership of the beach, introduced an access fee for swimmers and visitors. Florida Mauga Tagomailelagi, a family representative, stated that the family owns the beach and is responsible for its upkeep and beautification. According to Mauga Tagomailelagi, the decision to charge for beach access aligns with practices at other privately owned beaches on the island.

== Geography ==
Fatu-ma-Futi is a small ancient coastal village situated at the southwestern entrance of Pago Pago Harbor on Tutuila Island. The village spans approximately 260 meters along the coast, bordered by steep mountain slopes to the east and the open sea to the west. The village is located on a narrow, near-flat coastal terrace framed by Futi Rock to the south and Niuloa Point to the north. Inland, the land rises sharply towards the Sina Ridge, composed of volcanic materials including basaltic and andesitic flows from ancient eruptions 1–1.5 million years ago. The soils are primarily stony silty clay loam, supporting lush anthropogenic gardens with coconut, breadfruit, bananas, yams, and other crops. The reef and nearshore waters adjacent to the village are abundant in marine resources, including mollusks and fish, which historically provided sustenance for its inhabitants.

== Demographics ==
Year	Population
2020	72
2010	113
2000	103
1990	81
1980	76
1970	93
1960	63
