= Anua, American Samoa =

- Village
- Location within American Samoa
- Coordinates: 14°16′30″S 170°41′16″W
- Country: United States
- Territory: American Samoa
- County: Maoputasi

Area
  - Total: 0.24 sq mi (0.62 km^{2})

Population (2020)
  - Total: 473
  - Density: 2,000/sq mi (760/km^{2})

Anua (Samoan: Ānua) is a village on Tutuila Island, American Samoa. It is located close to the capital Pago Pago, on the coast of Pago Pago Harbor. The term Pago Pago is often used for several settlements on Pago Pago Bay, including Anua, Lepua, Utulei, and others. Anua is located in-between Satala and Atuʻu.

According to the 2010 U.S. census, Anua was ranked as the village in American Samoa with both the highest per capita income ($34,322) and highest median household income ($131,250). The ratio between female to male residents are 14 percent female and 86 percent male, the largest difference in American Samoa as of the 2000 U.S. census.

There are several general stores, fast food restaurants, amusement centers, and two gas station located in Anua along the north side of the roadway. These businesses mainly serve the workers at the nearby canneries. StarKist tuna and Samoa Packing are located in the village of Anua. Southwest Marine provides dry-dock facilities to incoming vessels in the Pago Pago Harbor. The StarKist Samoa cannery in Anua is the largest tuna cannery in the world.

== History ==
On January 23, 1918, the new government high school, Poyer School, named after the longest-serving governor, was completed in Anua. The school was located at the present location of StarKist. It provided education through grade nine and Mr. David Dykstra was the school's principal. His staff included Nelesoni Uaine and Faato-ia Tufele, who had completed their studies in Hawai'i. Built at a cost of US$25,000, it operated for nearly three decades and educated many of the territory’s leading political and business figures of the mid-20th century. It is named for Governor John Martin Poyer.

In 1930, the Bingham Commission's first executive session was held at the Poyer School in Anua, on the afternoon of their arrival to American Sāmoa. U.S. Senator Hiram Bingham marked the occasion by distributing commemorative medals and announcing that commissioners would wear them in official session. He then proclaimed the order of precedence as prescribed by President Herbert Hoover. Governor Gatewood Lincoln stated he would not attend hearings unless summoned, to avoid influencing testimony. Judge H. P. Wood designated Pago Pago, Leone, Nuʻuuli, and Taʻū as hearing sites, with the Poyer School at Anua serving as the central venue. The commission reconvened at the Poyer School on October 4 and spent its final three days there.

On October 7, 1930, more than 300 people - primarily matai and high chiefs - assembled at Anua to hear the Bingham Commission’s decisions. Governor Lincoln and his staff attended by invitation, and the chair, U.S. Senator Hiram Bingham, read the commission’s recommendations aloud.

During World War II, the Poyer School’s concrete buildings were requisitioned and converted into machine shops for a naval ship-repair unit.

In 1962, the Government of American Samoa authorized H.J. Heinz Company to establish a fish processing plant. The facility, named StarKist Samoa, dispatched its first canned tuna shipment from Pago Pago Harbor on October 4, 1963. In 2003, the company's canning division became part of Del Monte Foods Company. Later, in 2008, the South Korean firm Dongwon Industries acquired StarKist. Following this purchase, Dongwon also took over the adjacent can-producing factory.

== Demographics ==
Year	Population
2020	473
2010	18
2000	265
1990	65
1980	50
