= Courthouse of American Samoa =

- U.S. National Register of Historic Places
- U.S. Historic district – Contributing property
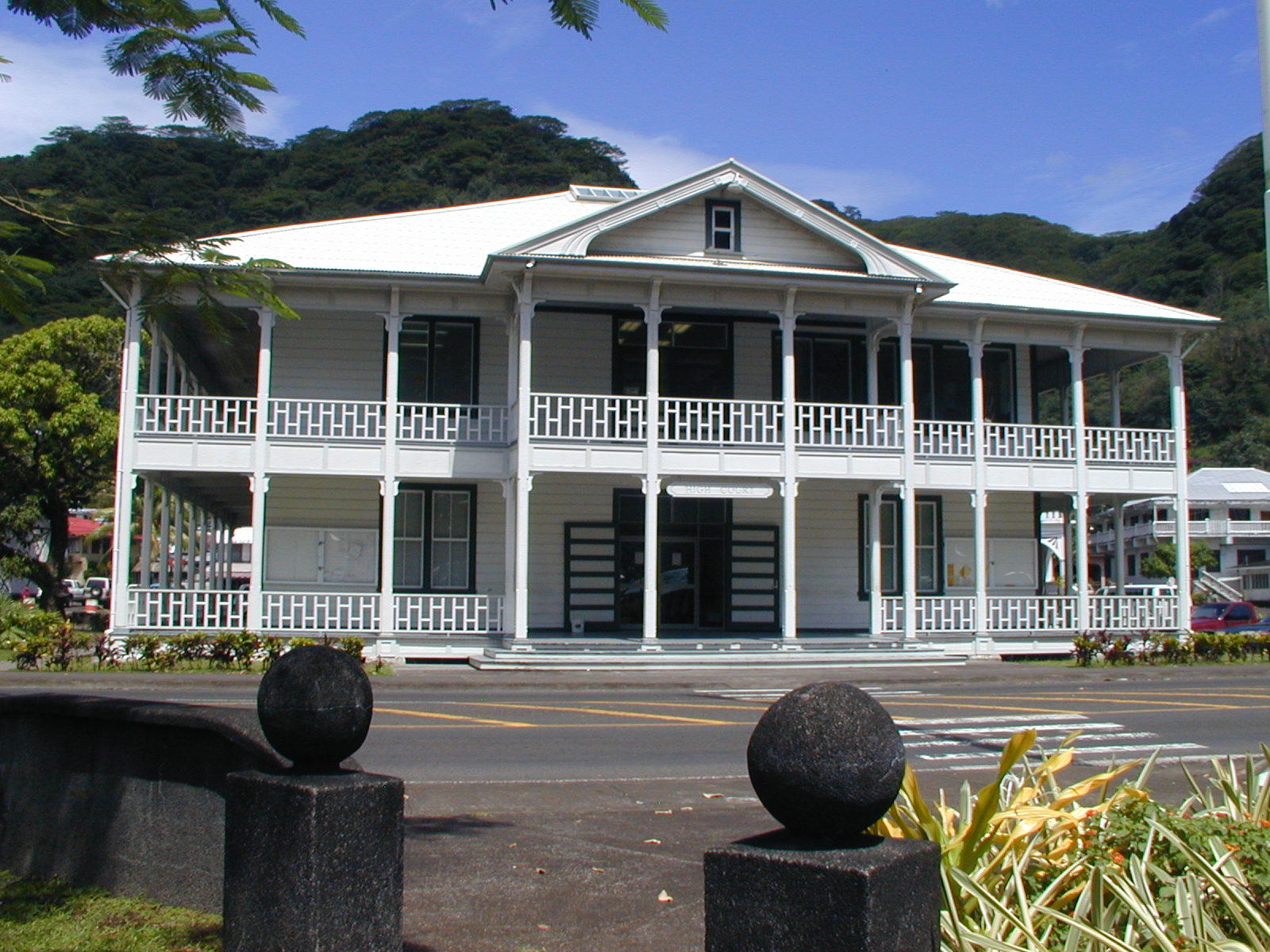

- Location within American Samoa
- Location: Near Pago Pago Harbor, Fagatogo, American Samoa
- Coordinates: 14°16′41″S 170°41′26″W
- Area: Less than 1 acre (0.40 ha)
- Built: 1904
- Part of: U.S. Naval Station Tutuila Historic District (ID90000854)
- NRHP reference No.: 74002180
- Added to NRHP: February 12, 1974

The Courthouse of American Samoa, formerly Administration Building, Navy No. 21, is a historic building near Pago Pago Harbor in Fagatogo, American Samoa. It is a two-story wood-frame building mounted on concrete piers, with a two-story veranda on three sides. A concrete vault is located at the back of the building. The court house was reported by the local commander to have been completed about 1904. It housed the offices and other facilities from which the United States Navy administered the island from its construction until 1952, and was where advisory councils (or fono) of the island's indigenous leaders were held. The building is one of the oldest standing in American Samoa, having survived typhoons and other perils.

The building was added to the National Register of Historic Places in 1974.

== Description and historic significance ==
The Historical Commission could not find any record showing the exact time the courthouse was erected. In July 1890, however, a careful research was conducted of the U.S. Navy’s projects and activities in American Samoa. Rear Admiral Kimberly, U.S.N. was ordered to administer the survey of an establishment of a U.S. Coaling Station in Pago Pago. The following report is, therefore, based on the results of this research.

The Navy Department on August 5, 1898, commanded civil engineer Frank T. Chamber, U.S.N., to travel to American Samoa for duty in connection with the erection of a wharf, a coal house, and other buildings at Pago Pago, Tutuila. The Commission is completely persuaded that the courthouse was one of the establishments which were built under Chamber's mission.

In March 1899, the Navy Department ordered Commander B.F. Tilley, U.S.N., Commanding Officer of the USS Abarenda, which reached Pago Pago in the same year, to regard the instructions issued to the Civil Engineer Chamber. At the same time, the incumbent president of the United States sent several Americans to help with the construction of the wharf and buildings. Two of these men were Charles C. King and Joseph J. Jewett. Admiral Tille lefty on 7 December 1899 for Auckland, New Zealand, to get materials for the implementation of the wharf and the buildings.

The Navy Department was notified on 25 July 1900 by the U.S. Post Office Department that a post office had been authorized at the U.S. Naval Station, Pago Pago, Tutuila. The post office opened on 1 October 1900, under the leadership of Mrs. Hudson, who was the wife of Chief Boatswain Hudson, U.S.N., and became the first postmaster for Tutuila, now known as American Samoa. Underneath the earliest Samoan hospital, The post office was built at Malaloa. 40 or 50 feet to the Pago Pago side of the post office stood Jewett’s house.

E.W. Gurr was a New Zealand lawyer and barrister. He was appointed by the Commandant as Secretary to the Commandant and also as Judge and Legal Adviser on 4 August 1900. Gurr's services to the government of the island came to an end in 1908.

Interviews with a number of people whose ages from 55 to 93 years in both American Samoa and Western Samoa, denoted that the Courthouse took about three years to complete; and that numerous people from Western Samoa worked as carpenters in its construction.

When the civil engineer Chamber was assigned to erect the wharf, coal house and other buildings in Pago Pago in 1898, to October 1, 1900, when the first U.S. post office was opened by Mrs. Hudson, to the tour of duty of Commander E. B. Underwood, U.S.N., which started on May 5, 1903 and ended on 20 January 1905. It would be a close estimation that the construction of the courthouse began some time in 1900 and ws completed either in the last part of 1903 or early in 1904. In arriving at this time estimate, the Commission also considered the employment of Mr. Gurr as a judge in August 1900. He presided over cases which were held nowhere else but in the courthouse, for the Commission found no records to show that early trials had been held elsewhere.

After the completion of construction of the courthouse, it was used at the time of the administration of the U.S. Navy, to house the offices of the Commandant-Governor, Chaplain, Disbursing Officer, Library, Aide to the Governor, on the upper floor. On the ground floor, there were offices of the judge (who was also the Secretary of Native Affairs), the Attorney General, the prosecutor, the head of the Police Department, the court clerk, the tax and passport clerk, the captain of the yard, and one spacious courtroom.

Additionally, the courtroom was used as an assembly hall or meeting place for the chiefs, leaders, and representatives from each village, county, and district of Tutuila and Manua, for their annual meetings, called the FONO. This continued until the enlisted men's barracks was assigned to the Legislature of American Samoa in 1954.

At present, the courthouse is assigned to the exclusive use of the court, or Judicial Department. It accommodates Two papalagi justices (chief and associate), and five Samoan judges. The building has two additional courtrooms now, with the old one being courtroom no. 1.

The courthouse, one of the oldest buildings in American Samoa, has survived two World Wars, numerous hurricanes, tropical downpours, and termite and insect damage.

== See also ==
- National Register of Historic Places listings in American Samoa
