= Gagamoe =

Historic area in American Samoa

Gagamoe is a historically significant area in Pago Pago, the territorial capital of American Samoa. As the traditional meeting place and village green of Pago Pago, Gagamoe is particularly notable as the central gathering site of the Mauga family, a lineage of prominent Samoan chiefs. It is part of the sacred communal land of the Mauga family, the paramount chiefs of Pago Pago and the broader Maʻopūtasi County. This elevated status is acknowledged in the honorific "O le Maputasi" ("The Single Chief's House"). Gagamoe has traditionally served as the Mauga family's guesthouse site, where significant meetings and discussions involving local leaders and the community have taken place.

== History ==
Gagamoe is notable for its role in the formalization of American Samoa’s relationship with the United States. On March 2, 1872, Commander Richard W. Meade of the United States Navy met with Mauga Manuma and other eastern Tutuila Island chiefs at Gagamoe to negotiate the establishment of the United States Naval Station Tutuila in Pago Pago Harbor. The resulting agreement granted the U.S. exclusive rights to the harbor in exchange for friendship and protection. It was at Gagamoe where, for the first time, the American flag was raised in the Samoan Islands.

This partnership was solidified decades later with the signing of the Deed of Cession of Tutuila and Aunu'u Islands on April 17, 1900, at Gagamoe. This formalized treaty between the U.S. and Samoan chiefs officially ceded American Samoa to the United States and solidified Pago Pago Harbor as a strategic American naval station in the Pacific.

In 1945, Gagamoe again played a critical role in American Samoan governance. From April 19 to 21, a significant meeting was held at the Gagamoe malae (open meeting field) to discuss changes to the governance structure of American Samoa. The gathering aimed to propose a plan for a territorial government with a formal lawmaking body. This plan was intended for submission to the U.S. president and Congress via the American Samoan Governor and the U.S. Navy. The discussion centered around legislative power and the establishment of a local legislature.

Gagamoe continues to serve as a central gathering place for community events in Pago Pago. Since 2000, the American Samoa Department of Education has hosted the East & West High School All-Star Football Game at Gagamoe’s athletic field.
