= Fatu Rock =

Islet in American Samoa

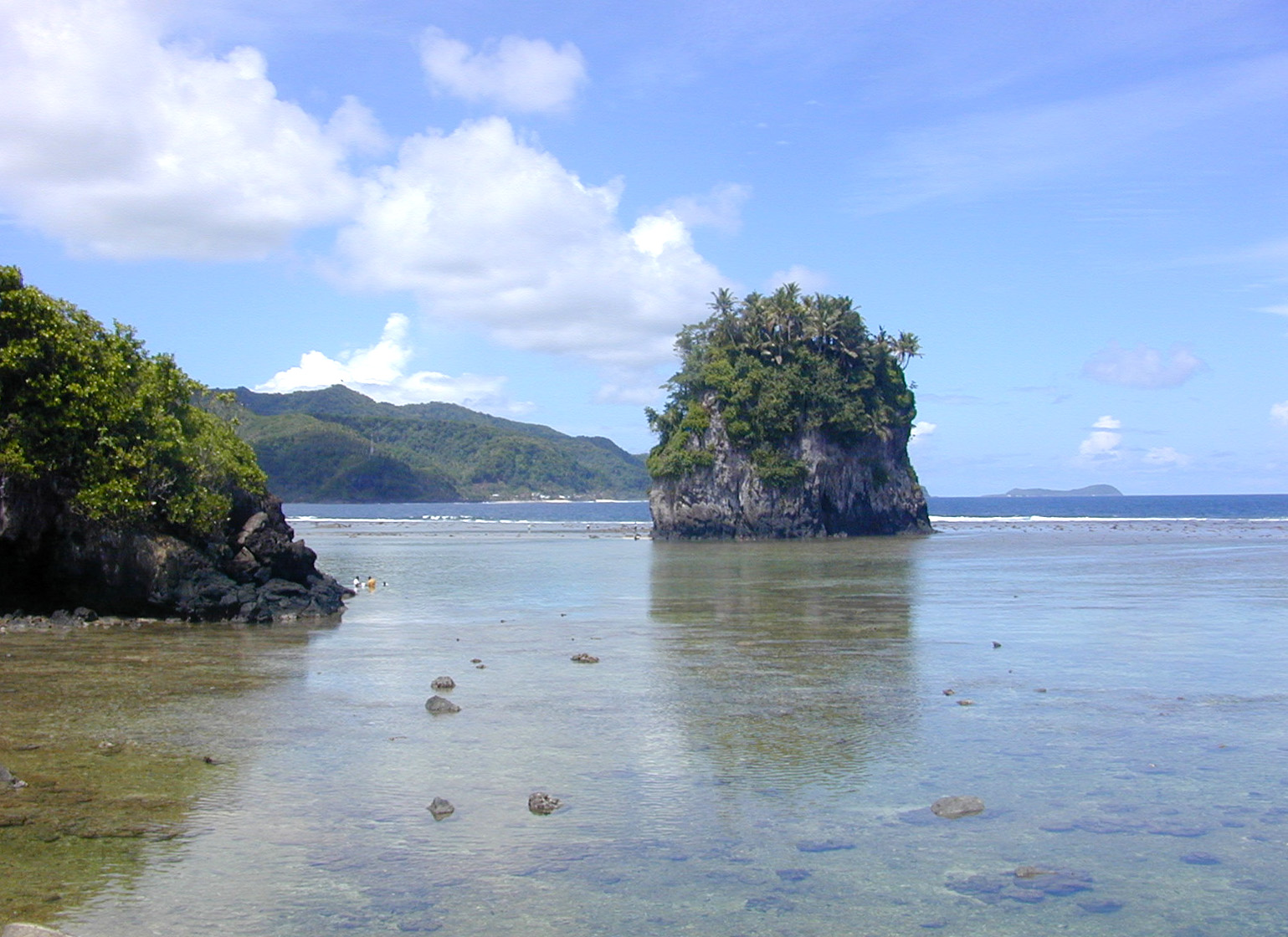
- Fatu Rock

- Location within American Samoa

Geography
- Coordinates: 14.2982°S 170.6765°W
- Area: 920 m^{2} (9,900 sq ft)
- Length: 49 m (161 ft)
- Width: 24 m (79 ft)
- Highest elevation: 32 m (105 ft)

Administration
- American Samoa

Fatu Rock is a natural landmark and offshore islet of American Samoa. It is located near the entrance of Pago Pago Harbor, close to the village of Fatumafuti. Fatu and nearby Futi are also known as Flowerpot Rock.

Legend has it that a couple, who was named Fatu and Futi, had sailed from Savai'i looking for Tutuila Island. When their canoe sank, the couple were transformed into these tree-topped islets.

The islet measures about 49 by 24 meters, or some 920 square meters in area. It has very steep, near vertical sides, reaching a height of 32 meters. Its top is densely wooded.

Since 2011, car plates on American Samoa have featured an image of Fatu Rock.

== See also ==
- Desert island
- List of islands
