= Navy Building 38 =

- U.S. National Register of Historic Places
- U.S. Historic district – Contributing property
- Location within American Samoa
- Location: Pago Pago Harbor, Fagatogo, American Samoa
- Coordinates: 14.2781°S 170.6883°W
- Area: 0.1 acres (0.040 ha)
- Built: 1917
- Architectural style: Tropical architecture
- Part of: U.S. Naval Station Tutuila Historic District (ID90000854)
- NRHP reference No.: 72001441

Significant dates
- Added to NRHP: March 16, 1972
- Designated CP: June 20, 1990

Navy Building 38 is a historic building on Route 1 in Fagatogo, American Samoa. Located on the north side of the road, it is a roughly square single-story building with a shallow-sloping pyramidal roof, that extends beyond the concrete block walls to create a lanai supported by fluted cast metal columns. The concrete blocks used in its construction were locally manufactured. The building was constructed about 1917 by the United States Navy as part of Naval Station Tutuila, to provide a home for high-powered radio transmission equipment capable of communicating directly with naval facilities in Hawaii during the First World War. It is one of three buildings known to have been built at the time with this combination of materials.

The building was listed on the National Register of Historic Places in 1972.

== See also ==
- National Register of Historic Places listings in American Samoa
