= Atuʻu, American Samoa =

Atuʻu
- Village
- Location within American Samoa
- Coordinates: 14°16′28″S 170°41′5″W
- Country: United States
- Territory: American Samoa
- County: Maoputasi

Area
  - Total: 0.35 sq mi (0.91 km^{2})
- Elevation: 105 ft (32 m)

Population (2020)
  - Total: 236
  - Density: 670/sq mi (260/km^{2})
- Time zone: UTC−11 (Samoa Time Zone)
- ZIP code: 96799
- Area code: +1 684

Atuʻu is a village on Tutuila Island, American Samoa. It is located on the coast of Pago Pago Harbor, close to the capital, Pago Pago.

Atuʻu is the location of two tuna canneries, the main employers in American Samoa.

According to business license records from the Government of American Samoa, the village of Atuu is home to 28 commercial businesses. Most of these are fast-food restaurants, eateries, night clubs, bars, and retail shops. The village is also home to a medical clinic, a laundromat, a consultant organization, and a fish agent. A portion of the StarKist Tuna complex is also located in Atuu.

== History ==
In 1909, the Marist Brothers founded the Marist Sisters School in Atuʻu, where all instruction was conducted in English. Six years later, in 1915, they established the Marist Brothers School in the same area. In 1975, the Marist Brothers High School was relocated to Malaeloa. By 2024, StarKist Samoa had leased the land from the Roman Catholic Diocese of Samoa–Pago Pago and plans to develop the site for housing guest workers.

On February 17, 1944, the U.S. Naval Station’s destroyer repair facility at Atuʻu was finished and officially designated U.S. Naval Ship Repair Unit, Navy 129. The project’s building construction cost was estimated at US$884,860; machinery expenditures were US$344,232, and vehicles US$48,489.

In 1953, the Rockefeller Company launched the first fish cannery on Tutuila Island. A year later, Van Camp Seafood Company — a division of Ralston-Purina at the time — acquired the facility, rebranding it as Chicken of the Sea in 1976. Thai Union Group took over Chicken of the Sea in 2000, but after implementing three federally mandated wage increases within two years, the production line was closed in 2009. Subsequently, in April 2015, the Italian firm Tri Marine, the third-largest seafood provider in the United States, opened a cannery at the same Atu'u location. However, operations were halted in December 2016.

In 1993, a village fire in Atu’u severely burned the house of Judge Falepule Itumalo A’au. He was evacuated to Hawai’i for treatment but died of his injuries.

In 2002, traditional leaders in Atuʻu imposed a nightly curfew to combat social problems due to the number of nightclubs.

In 2026, a dispute resurfaced over the administration of Atu'u land, which Paramount Chief Mauga Moi Moi conveyed in 1911 to be held in trust for the people of the Manuʻa Islands. Manuʻa leaders began discussing who should oversee the trust while the Tufele title remains vacant and how commercial lease revenues should be managed for the beneficiaries.

== Demographics ==
| Year | Population |
|---|---|
| 2020 | 236 |
| 2010 | 359 |
| 2000 | 413 |
| 1990 | 408 |
| 1980 | 377 |
| 1970 | 305 |
| 1960 | 186 |
| 1950 | 91 |
| 1940 | 48 |
| 1930 | 41 |
