= Area code 684 =

Telephone area code for American Samoa

Coordinates: 14.3°S 170.7°W

Area code 684 is a telephone area code in the North American Numbering Plan (NANP) for American Samoa. The numbering plan area comprises the seven islands of Tutuila, Aunuʻu, Ofu, Olosega, Taʻū, Swains Island, and Rose Atoll.

== History ==
Previous to joining the North American Numbering Plan, American Samoa used the ITU country code 684. It became the only area south of the equator that is part of the NANP.

The entry of American Samoa into the North American Numbering Plan was authorized by the Federal Communications Commission (FCC) on December 24, 2002. Area code 684 was assigned on January 24, 2003. The area code was installed on October 2, 2004, when a six-month permissive dialing period started, and central office code were available for order. When the area code was installed, American Samoa had one rater center, and ten central offices. All calls within the numbering plan area are local calls, dialed with seven digits, or with the prefix 0 and the area code. The long-distance access code is 1.

Initial central offices upon NANP admission
Central office code	Location	Telephone company
622	Fagaitua	ASTCA
633	Fagatogo	ASTCA
644	Satala	ASTCA
655	Ofu	ASTCA
677	Tau	ASTCA
688	Leone	ASTCA
699	Tafuna	ASTCA
691	Olotele/Aoloau	ASTCA
733	Cellular	ASTCA
258	PCS	BLUE SKY

As of 2020, additional central office prefixes were 248, 252, 254, 256, 272, 630, 731, 770, and 782.

== See also ==
- Telecommunications in American Samoa

American Samoa area codes: 684
	North: Pacific Ocean, 808	
West: country code +685 in Samoa	area code 684	East: Pacific Ocean
	South: Pacific Ocean, country code +683 in Niue	
Hawaii area codes: 808
