= Malaloa, American Samoa =

Sub-village of Fagatogo, American Samoa

Coordinates: 14.2759°S 170.6934°W

Malaloa is a sub-village of Fagatogo and is located at the end of Pago Pago Harbor in American Samoa. It is located in-between Fagatogo proper and the village of Pago Pago. Cruising boats entering and leaving Pago Pago should clear at Malaloa Marina. The Malaloa Marina was opened for cruisers’ use and has added a customs wharf to handle inbound and outbound clearances.

In 1912, a hospital was constructed on the face of the hill overlooking Pago Pago Bay in Malaloa. It also housed the first nursing school in American Samoa. The health center was later relocated to Utulei until the new LBJ Hospital in Faga'alu was completed on June 6, 1968. The school of nursing in Malaloa became the first high school in American Samoa when established in 1946.

The American Samoa Senate approved a bill in August 2018 which allocated $1.5 million for the construction of the Malaloa Dock.

A designated park area administrated by the Department of Parks and Recreation is located between Burns Philp and the yacht quay.

== History ==
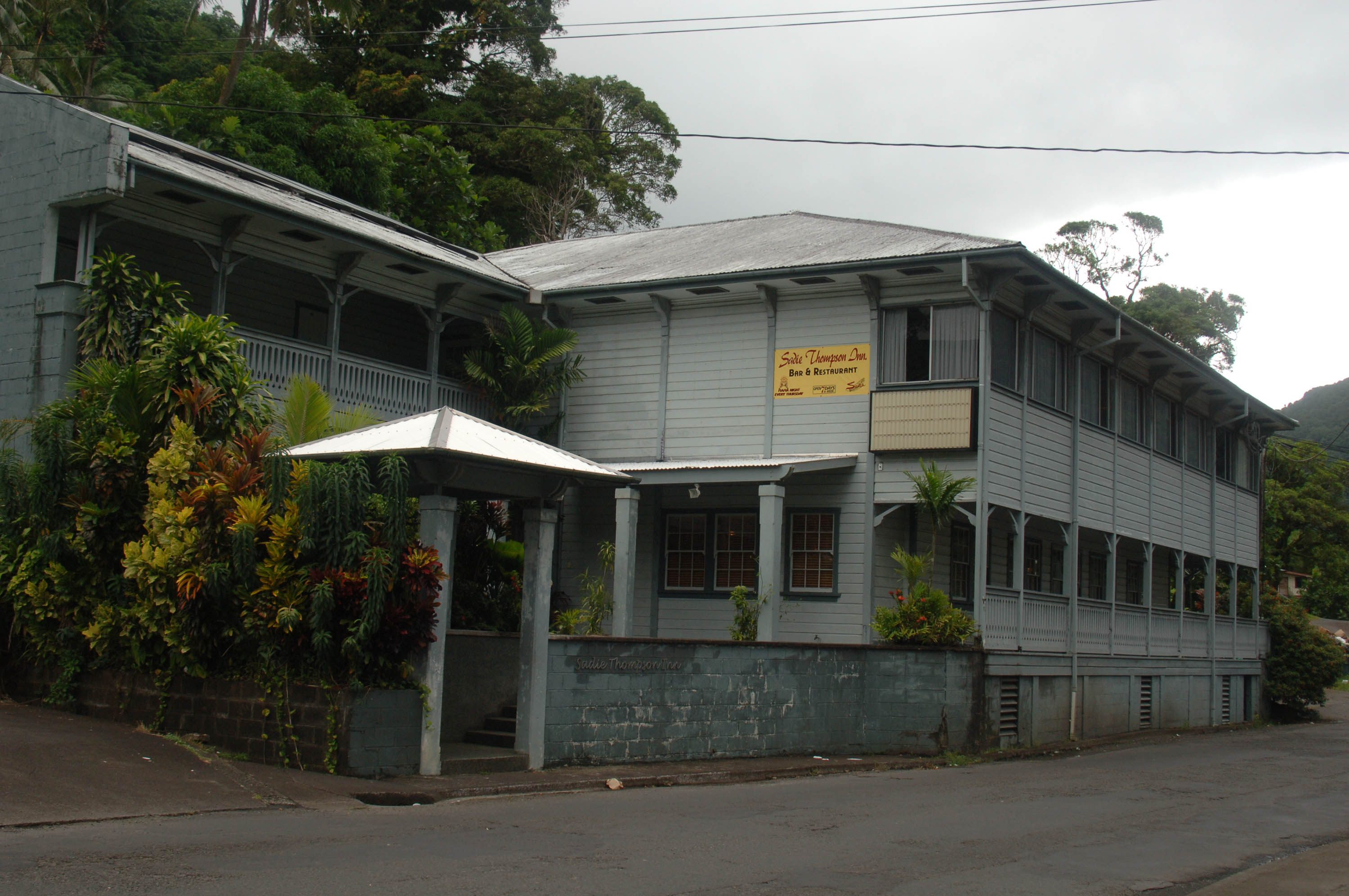
Sadie Thompson Inn

On September 1, 1912, the first Samoan Hospital was completed at Malaloa. The hospital was constructed on a hillside next to the current location of Sadie Thompson Inn. The hospital included a wooden central administration building which contained an examination room, lavatory, dispensary, and dressing room. Outbuildings were erected for a kitchen, baths, a storeroom, and latrine. A windmill was built near the shore to pump water to a 10,000-US-gallon (38,000 L; 8,300 imp gal) tank located 60 feet (18 m) above the level of the main building. With the completion of the 1912 Malaloa hospital, a major step had been taken to improve overall health on American Samoa. While the U.S. Navy approved the hospital project, it clarified that funds from the U.S. Treasury Department could not be utilized for construction. A Samoan fund was created to finance the cost of construction.

On February 14, 1914, a nurses' training program was inaugurated at the hospital in Malaloa. The program quickly gained popularity, with young girls across the territory being encouraged to pursue careers in nursing. Early pioneers of the facility included Initia Nemaia, Pepe Malemo, and Feiloa’iga Iosefa.

W. Somerset Maugham resided at the Sadie Thompson Inn in Malaloa during his six-week visit to American Samoa in 1916. The building later became the setting of his short story “Rain”, which was published in 1921. At the time when Maugham visited in 1916, Malaloa had a small dock which was used by lighters to carry goods. Passengers boarded ships on the main wharf. The Sadie Thompson Inn building was added to the U.S. National Register of Historic Places in 2003.

In 1946, American Samoa's first high school was established at Malaloa, which used to be the site of the first hospital. The school was known as the High School of American Samoa.
