= Pago Pago Harbor =

Bay in American Samoa

Coordinates: 14.276°S 170.676°W

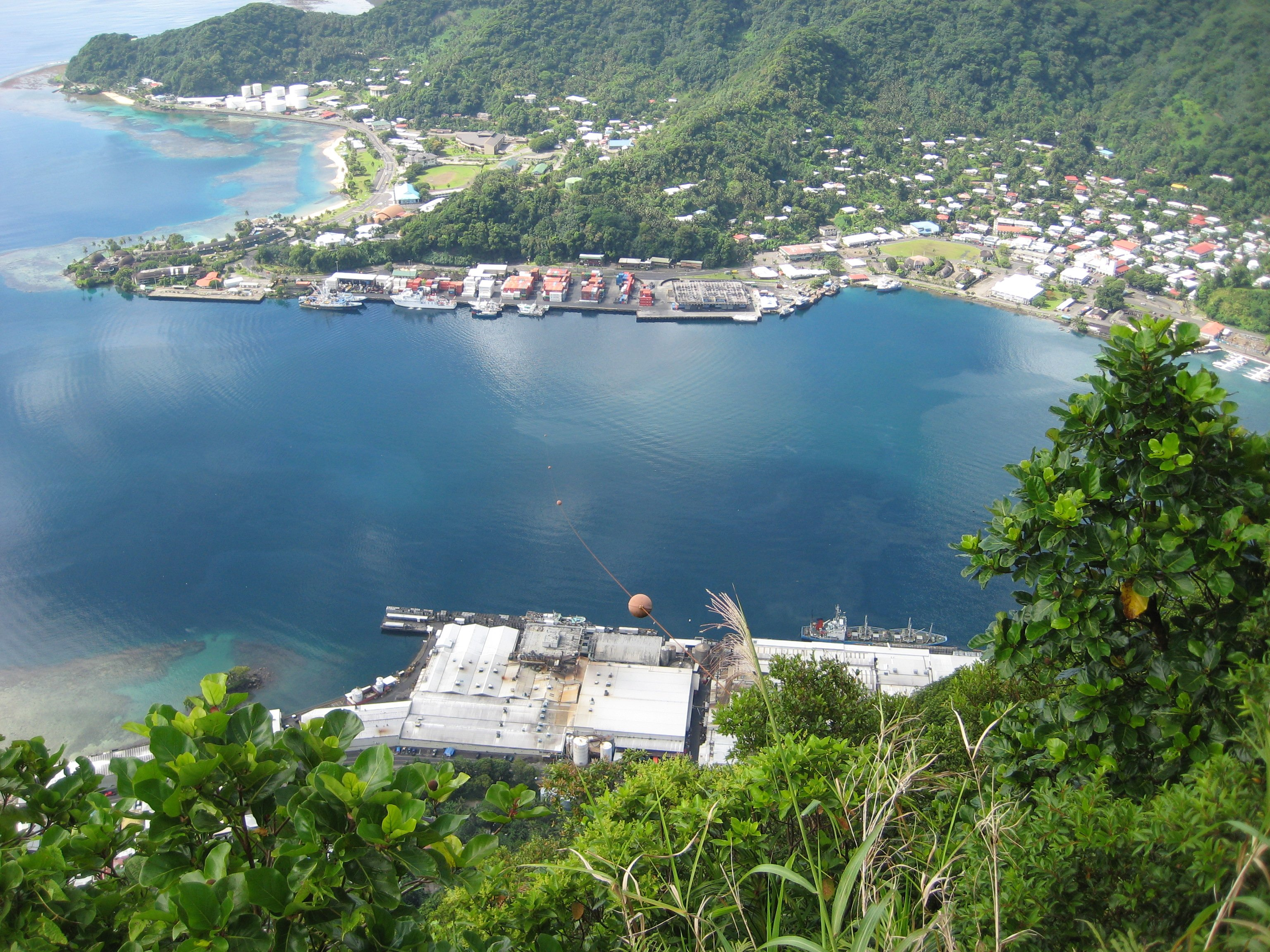
Pago Pago Harbor is capable of accommodating the largest cruise ships.

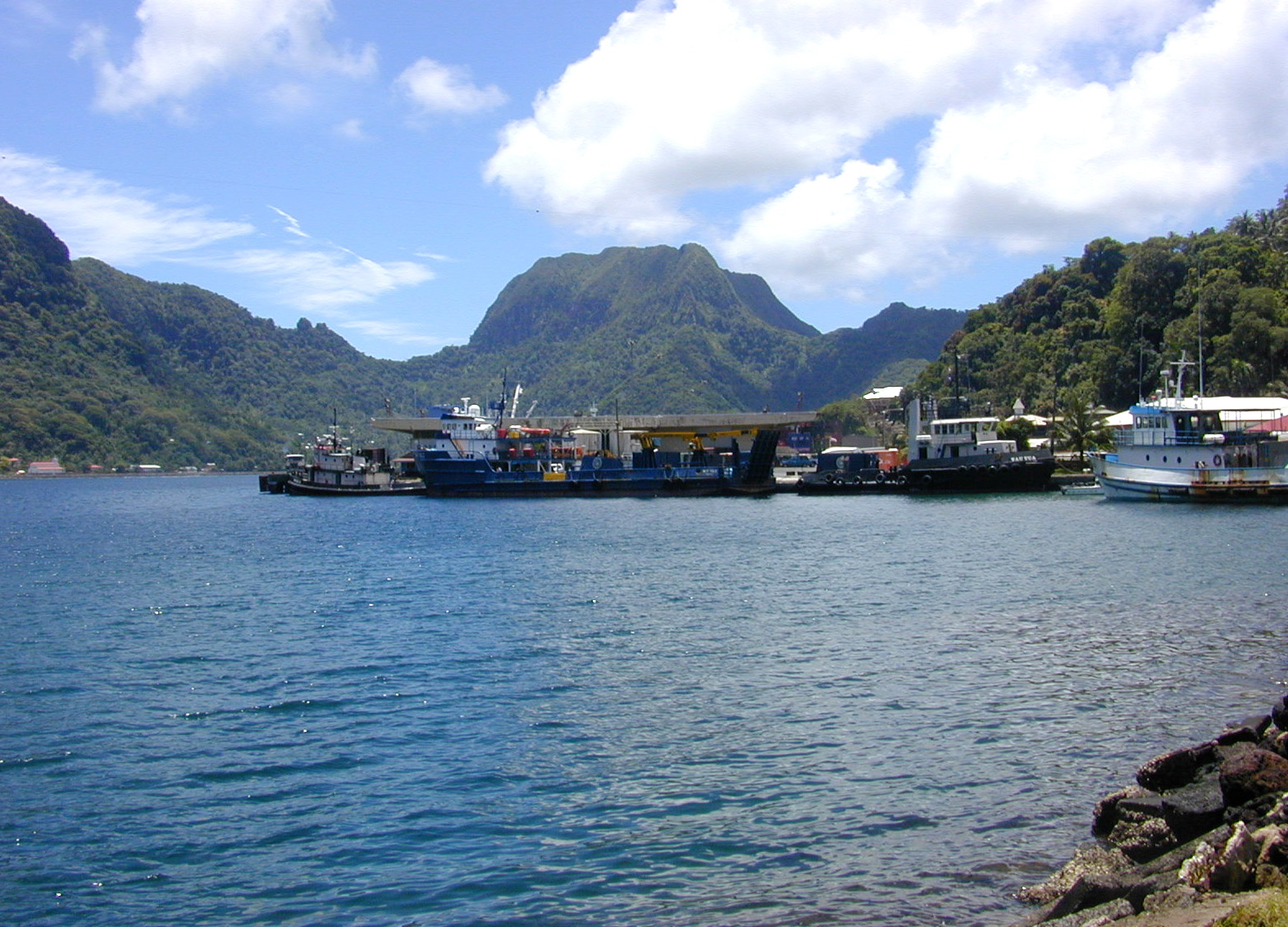
A portion of the docks at Fagatogo in Pago Pago Harbor. In the background is Rainmaker Mountain.

Pago Pago Harbor on Tutuila Island in American Samoa is one of the world's largest natural harbors. The capital, Pago Pago, is located on the inner reaches of the harbor, close to its northwesternmost point. It has the highest annual rainfall of any harbor in the world. It is also considered one of the best and deepest deepwater harbors in the South Pacific Ocean or in Oceania as a whole. Pago Pago Bay is over 400 feet (120 m) deep and two miles (3.2 km) long. As part of the Pago Volcano caldera, the harbor is 50% landlocked.

== Villages and mountains ==
Villages along the harbor include several communities in the Greater Pago Pago Area, including Utulei, Fagatogo, Malaloa, Pago Pago proper, Satala, Anua and Atuʻu. The legislature and High Court are located in Fagatogo, while the executive offices are located in Utulei.

Pago Pago Harbor is surrounded and sheltered by mountains such as Mount ʻAlava, Mount Matafao and Rainmaker Mountain (Mount Pioa). The entrance to Pago Pago Bay is marked by two mountains: Mount Peiva in the east and Matafao Peak in the west. The harbor is all that remains from the volcanic crater that built Tutuila Island. At some point, one wall of the crater collapsed and the sea came rushing in creating a near complete shelter from the power of the sea at large.

The village communities which lie within the Pago Pago Bay Area are jointly known as Maʻopūtasi ("the only house of chiefs"). They are Pago Pago, Aūa, Fagatogo, Leloaloa and Fagaʻalu.

== Tsunami ==
Fagatogo was struck by a tsunami on 29 September 2009, causing damage and rock slides.

A significant amount of debris and oil were dumped into Pago Pago Harbor during the earthquake and tsunami, which devastated communities along the harbor's coastline, including Pago Pago. Debris including cars, household items, and boats were thrown into the harbor by the force of the wave. According to the 14-page American Samoan government report, Post-Tsunami Coastal Resource Damage Assessment, "The inner section of Pago Pago Harbor is severely polluted and will require an extensive cleanup program with a significant amount of manpower ... The destruction is everywhere." An oil spill approximately 40 feet (12 m) wide occurred at the mouth of Pago Pago Harbor as a result of the tsunami. Barrels containing fuel were thrown into the harbor by the tsunami and washed up on shore.

It was suggested that one must avoid eating any fish or invertebrate caught in Pago Pago Harbor because they are contaminated with heavy metals and other pollutants.

== See also ==
- List of deepest natural harbours
