= Afono, American Samoa =

Afono
- Village
- Afonotele
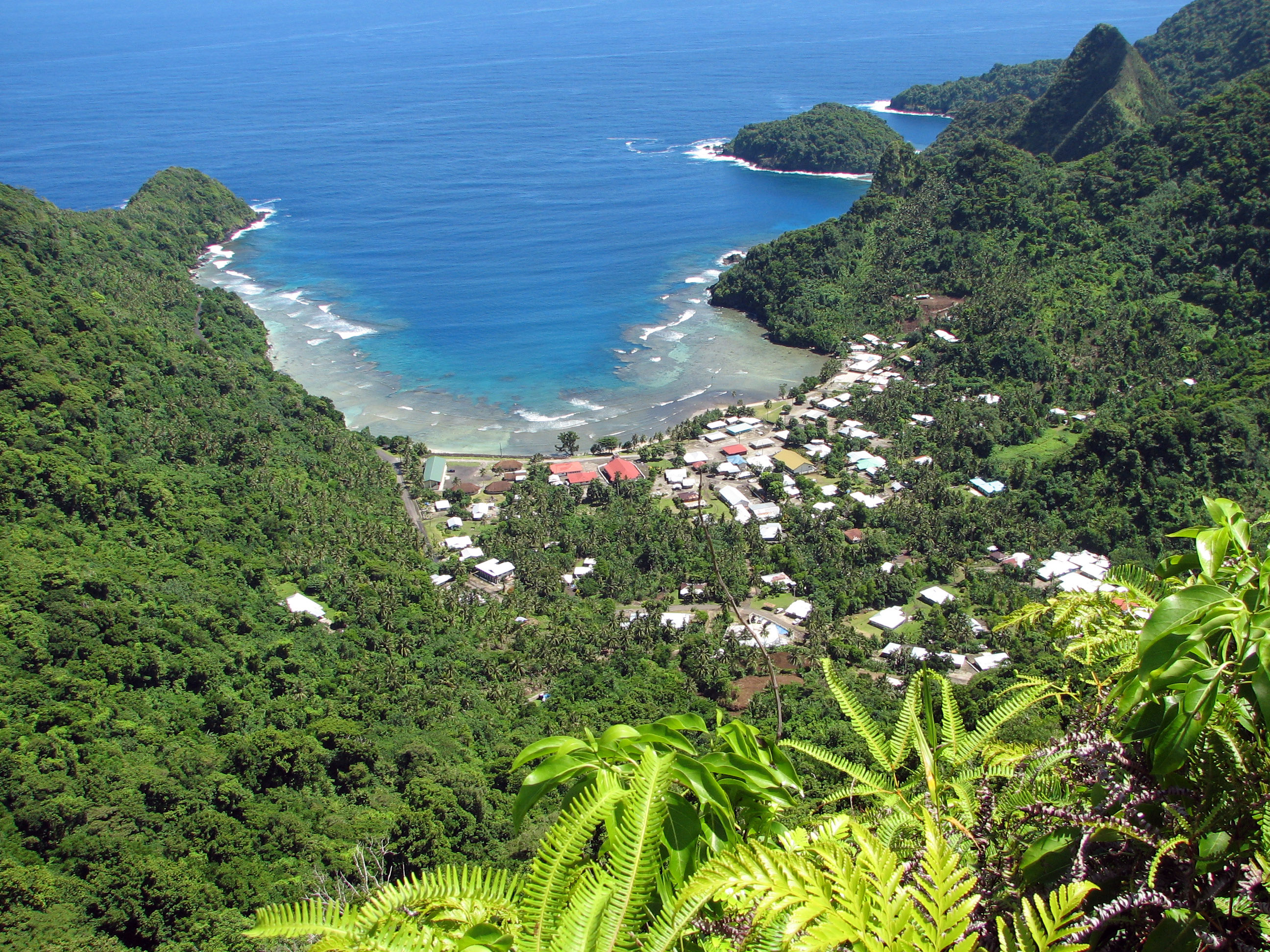

- Location within American Samoa
- Coordinates: 14°15′51″S 170°39′3″W
- Country: United States
- Territory: American Samoa
- County: Sua

Government
  - Mayor: Tuapa Manutui

Area
  - Total: 1.2 sq mi (3 km^{2})
- Elevation: 85 ft (26 m)

Population (2020)
  - Total: 327
  - Density: 280/sq mi (110/km^{2})

Afono (Samoan: Āfono) is a village on the northeast coast of Tutuila Island, American Samoa. One of the island's more populous villages, it is located on the edge of Afono Bay, at the eastern edge of the National Park of American Samoa. It is connected by Highway 6 to Vatia, which lies along the coast to the northwest, and to Aua, on the edge of Pago Pago Harbor to the south via a winding stretch of highway which crosses the spine of the island.

Afono has been inhabited for at least 1000 years.

== History ==
In the late 1960s, Senator Mata’utia Tautunu championed the construction of a road over the mountains between Aūa and Āfono. The subsequent addition of the Āfono-Vatia section transformed it into the longest and most expensive secondary road in American Samoa. By 1998, this road became the primary access route to the National Park of American Samoa.

== Geography ==
Afono is a village on the north shore of Tutuila Island in American Samoa, located by Afono Bay. Afono is situated over Afono Pass, which sits in-between Rainmaker Mountain and the Maugaloa Ridge. The village is home to traditional thatched huts. It is reached by following Highway 6 northbound from the village of Aua. The road from Aua includes several steep switchbacks up to Rainmaker Pass, and continues equally steeply down to the village of Afono. The village borders the Tutuila-section of National Park of American Samoa.

Afono spreads out across the backside of Rainmaker Mountain. Afono Bay is home to a pebbly beach but it is almost non-existent except at low tide.

== National Park ==
Access to the Tutuila unit of the National Park of American Samoa is primarily through a paved road which runs along the perimeter of the upper end of Pago Pago Harbor. Lateral roads lead to Fagasā Pass and the park's western end and to Afono Pass at its eastern end. The latter lateral road also leads to the villages of Afono and Vatia. Road signs marking entrance points to the National Park unit have been placed along the Afono/Vatia road near Matape Hill/Craggy Point, near the park boundary in the vicinity of Afono Pass, and above the village's western side. A National Park Service visitor center has been proposed in Afono.

The stands of endemic broadleaf forest located between Fagasā and Afono provide habitat for large numbers of native bird species. The best and biggest known roost on Tutuila Island for the Sheath-tailed bat is located in the Anapeʻape Cove near Afono. Two decades ago 10,000 sheath-tailed bats were occupying the caves.

Lands within the Tutuila unit presently under cultivation for substance agriculture are confined to areas above Afono and Vatia villages.

== Demographics ==
Population growth
2020	327
2010	524
2000	530
1990	434
1980	284
1970	278
1960	184
1950	169
1940	138
1930	96

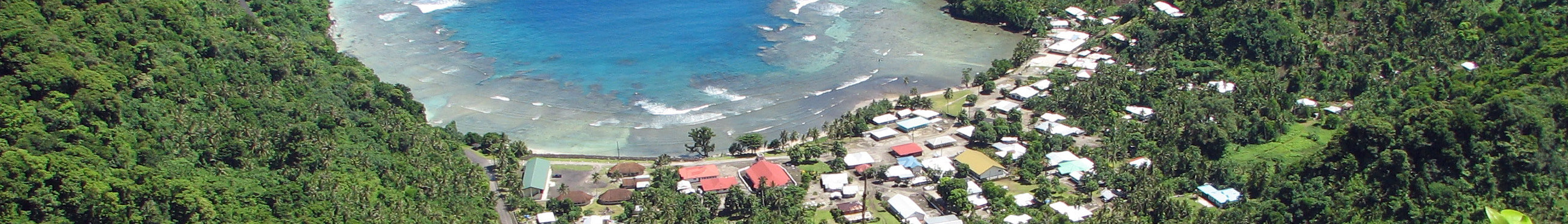

== See also ==
- National Park of American Samoa
