= List of National Natural Landmarks in American Samoa =

This is a list of National Natural Landmarks (NNL) in American Samoa. All locations are on communally owned lands.

Name	Designated	District	Coordinates	Description	Image
Cape Taputapu	1972	Western	14.3214°S 170.8432°W	A natural exhibit of shoreline, offshore volcanic rocks, and blowholes sculpted by heavy sea-wave action	
Fogamaʻa Crater	1972	Western	14.3568°S 170.7535°W	One of very few illustrations of the most recent episode of volcanism in American Samoa	
Matafao Peak	1972	Eastern	14.2939°S 170.7045°W	One of five great masses of volcanic rocks that extruded as molten magma during the major episodes of volcanism that created Tutuila Island	
Leʻala Shoreline	1972	Western	14.3600°S 170.7773°W	A young flow of basalt, inter-bedded with layers of tuff, that illustrates erosion by wave action	
Rainmaker Mountain (Mount Pioa)	1972	Eastern	14.2725°S 170.6558°W	An outstanding example of the gigantic plugs that created Tutuila Island	
Vai'ava Strait	1972	Eastern	14.2393°S 170.6715°W	A classic illustration of steep cliffs and erosion-resistant outliers formed by wave action on a volcanic mass	
Aunu'u Island	1972	Eastern	14.2833°S 170.5534°W	The site of recent episodes of volcanism backed by a geologically recent tuff cone	
