= Pola Island =

Island in American Samoa

Coordinates: 14°14′03″S 170°40′14″W

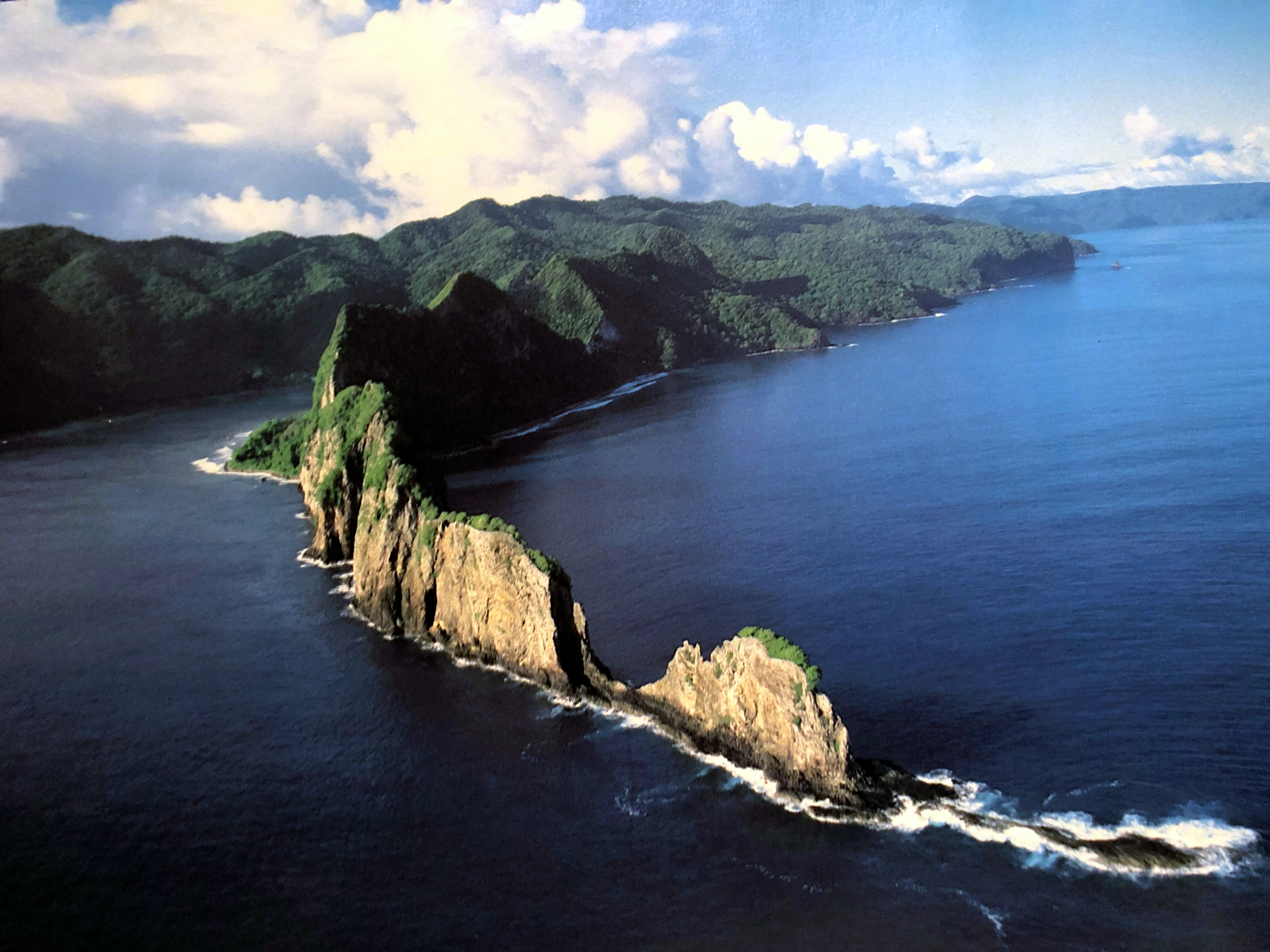
Cockscomb Point as seen jutting into the ocean.

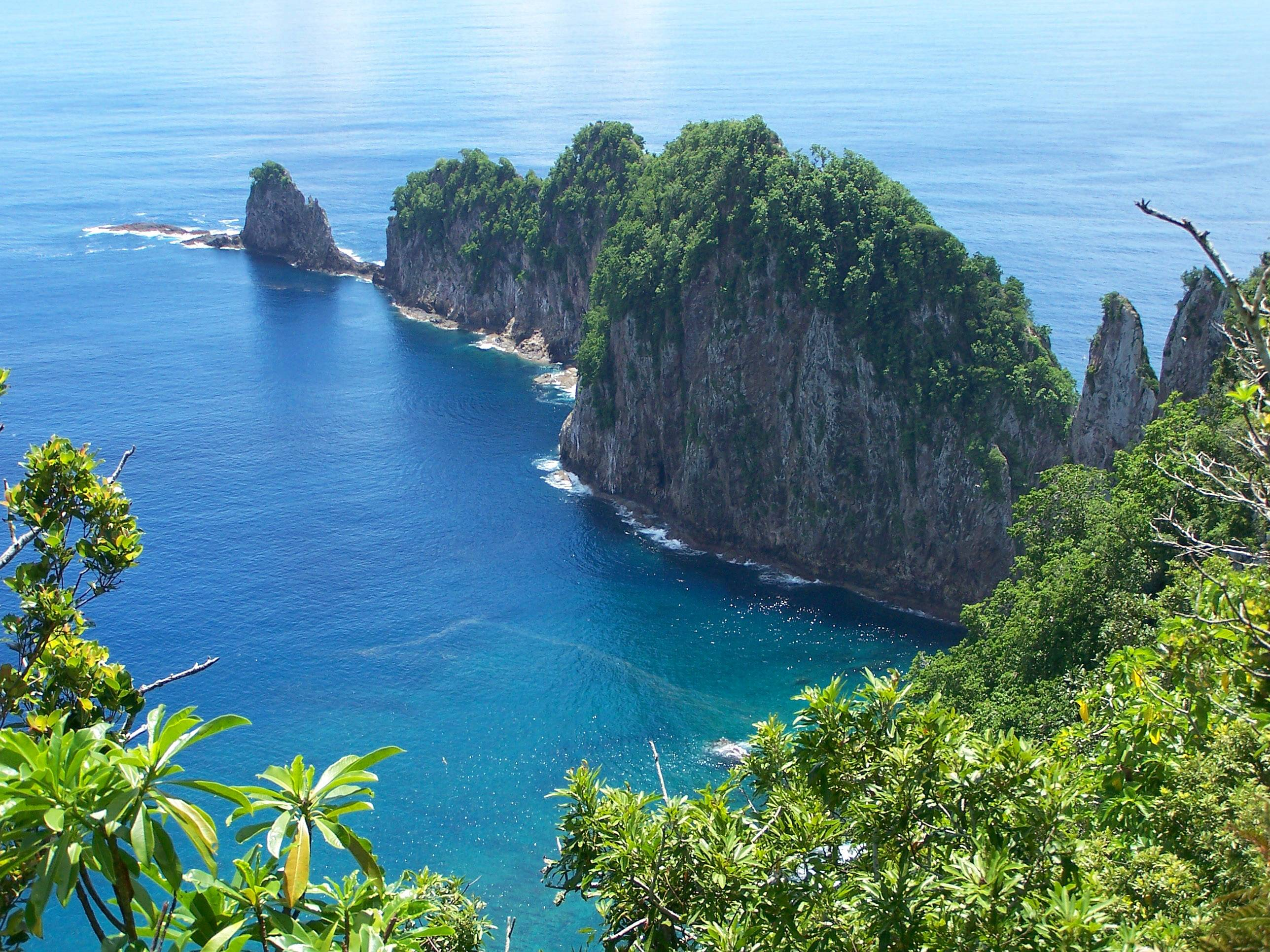
Pola Island

Pola Island (Samoan: Motu o Pola and Pola Tai) is an island just offshore from the village of Vatia on Tutuila Island in American Samoa. It is also known as Cockscomb. Pola Island is designated as part of the National Park American Samoa and is a popular tourist attraction. It is located on the west side of Vatia Bay, and serves as both a landmark and an icon for Vatia. Pola Island has been named one of American Samoa's Seven National Wonders by the Pago Pages. It has been named "the most beautiful natural feature of Tutuila Island” by travel guide publisher Lonely Planet. Pola Island is known for its high cliffs, populated by seabirds, and is one of American Samoa's primary seabird nesting sites.

== Etymology ==
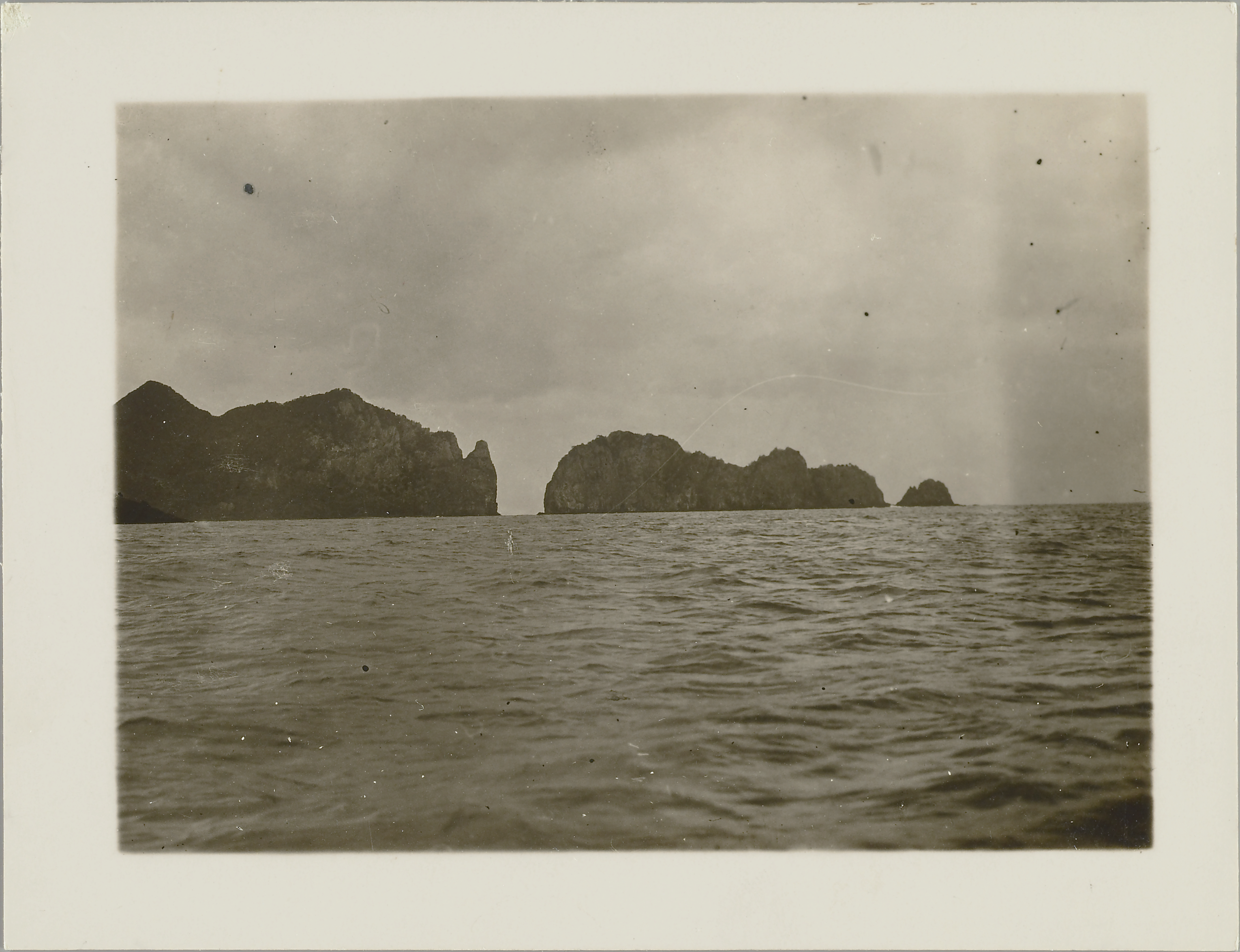
Pola Tai and Pola Uta, 1907.

According to the late High Orator Nanai Afuola Kalasa, the most senior chief authority, the island is directly linked to a legend about the village's creation. A couple sailed westward from the Manu'a Islands with their daughter, with the hopes of reaching Upolu Island. A few days later, they struggled with rough seas and the raft gave up on them. All the three perished and mutated into rocks. The couple was Pola and Pola, while the daughter was Faleofia. These rock forms are named after this couple. Uta translates to “closer to land”, and Pola'uta is the name of the ridge on the opposite side of the strait. “Tai” translates to “further from land”, and Pola Tai is a name used for Pola Island.

== Geography and geology ==
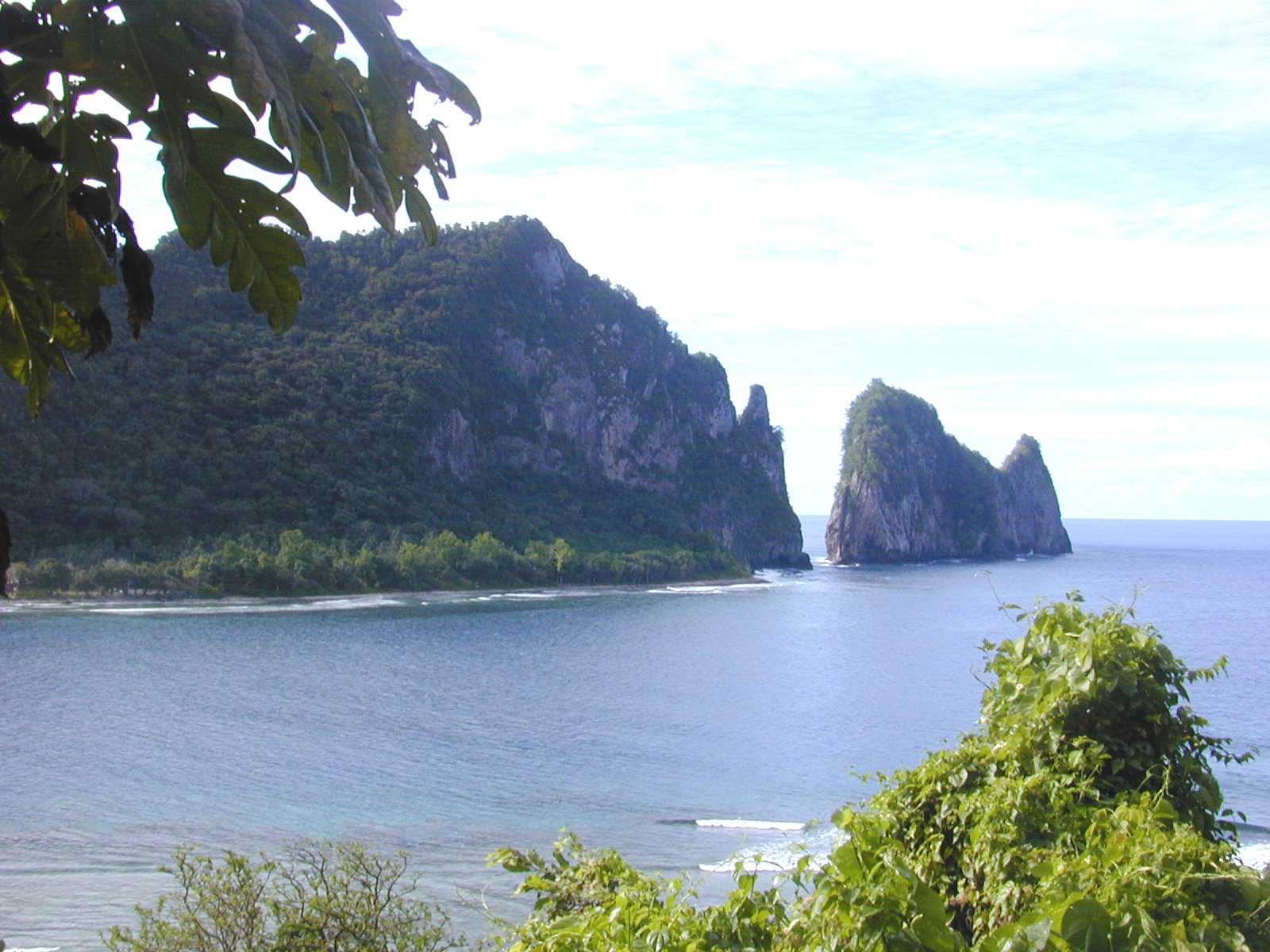
Vai'ava Strait National Natural Landmark

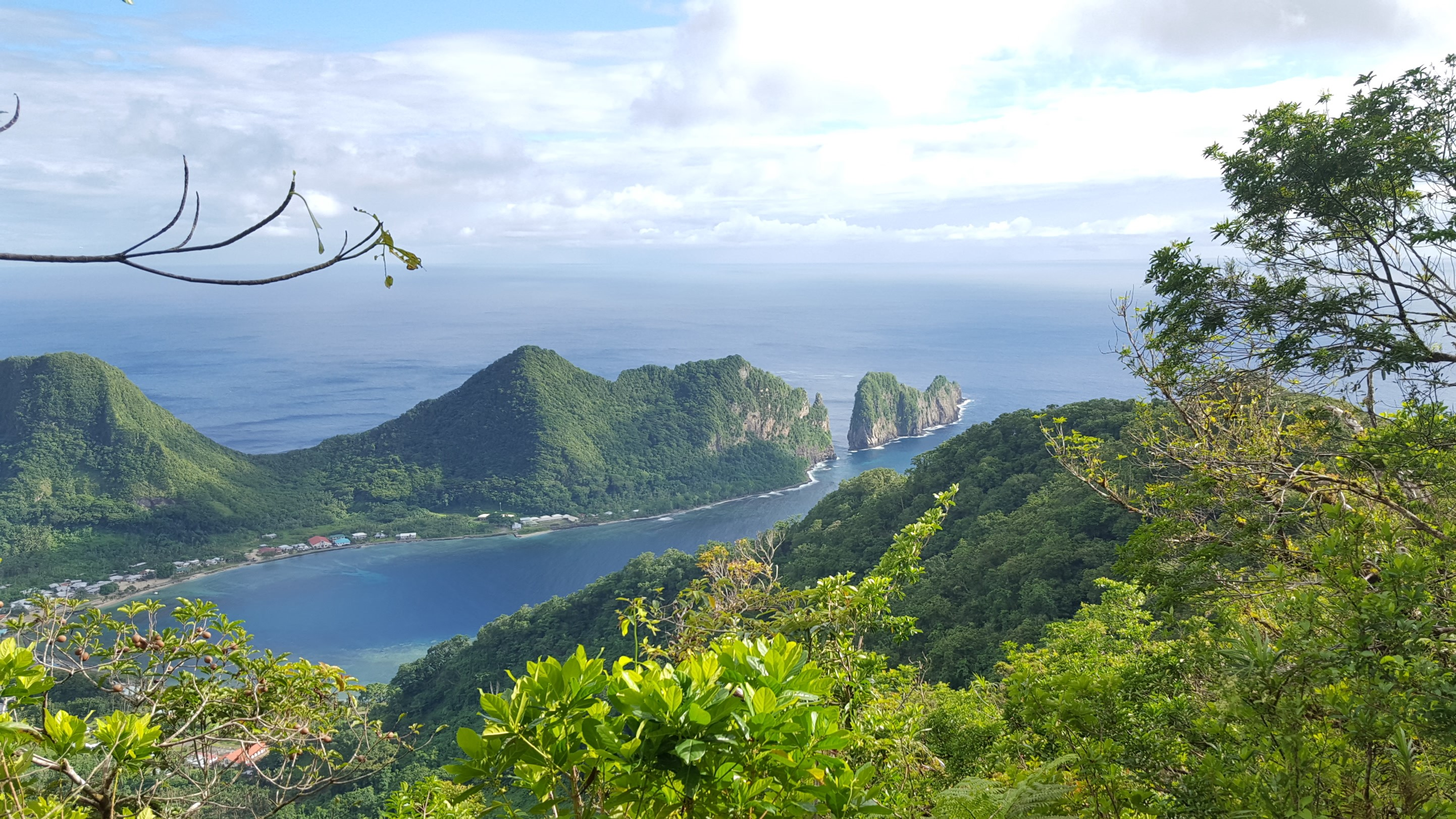
Pola Tai, Pola'uta Ridge and Vatia as seen from the Mount Alava Adventure Trail.

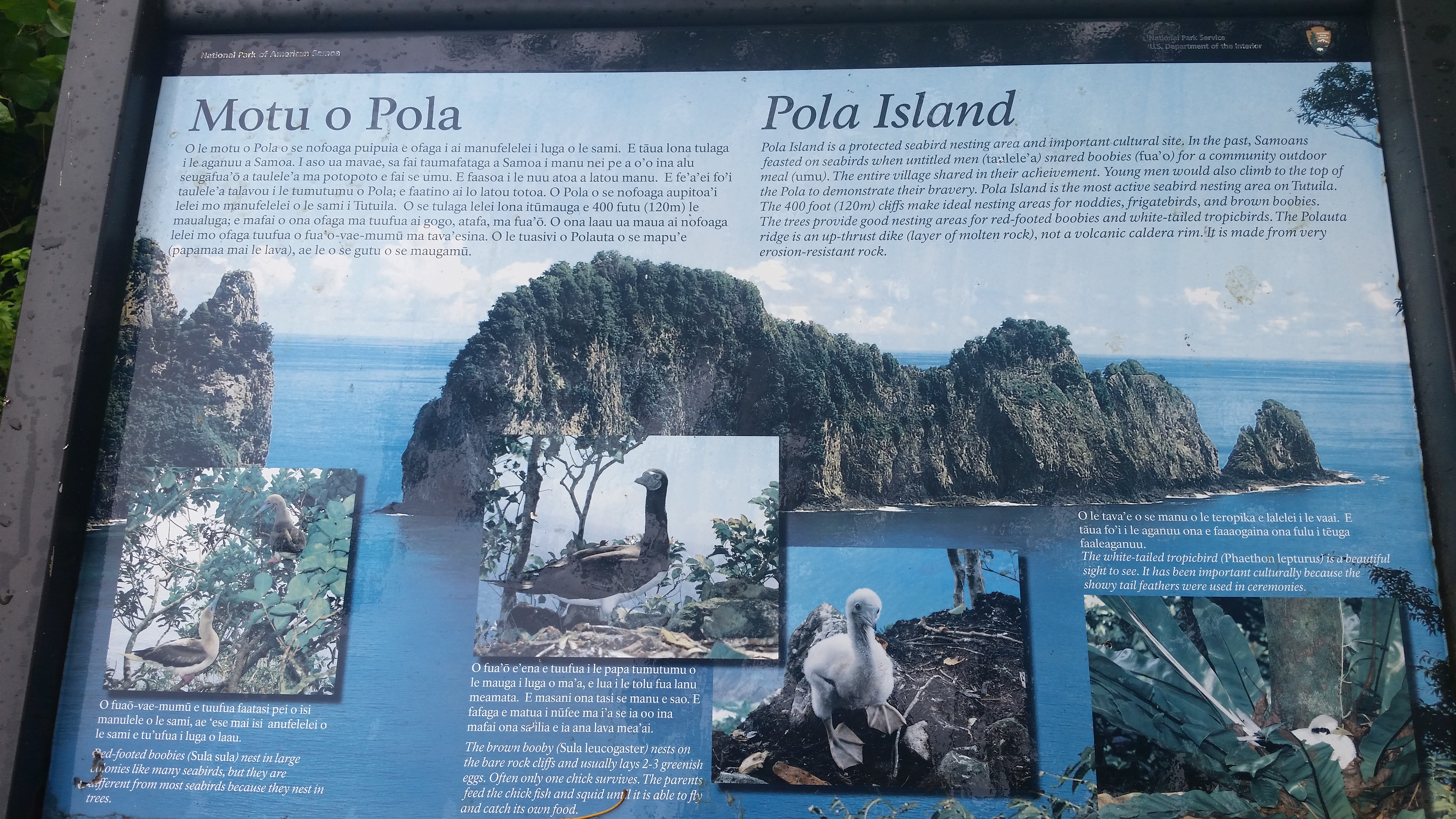
National Park sign

The island is separated from land by the Vai'ava Strait. Vai'ava Strait National Natural Landmark makes up 250 acres and is the only National Natural Landmark in American Samoa that is also part of the National Park of American Samoa. Passing east through the town of Vatia, the road ends at the Pola Island trailhead. A short path leads to a large cobblestone beach. Two sea arches are visible from the base of the cliffs extending into the ocean.

Pola Scenic Point is located on the road into Vatia village. This observation site overlooks Pola Island and the Vai'ava Strait National Natural Landmark. Pola Island is a prominent basalt sea stack with steep cliffs and scenic forest-covered headlands. It is an important nesting place for at least eight seabird species. All of Pola Island and the eastern parts of Polauta Ridge contain undisturbed forest.

Erosion by the sea has sculpted the cliffs and sea arches in the rocks of the huge volcanic plug known as Pola Island. The rock formations of Pola Island resemble a dinosaur tail jutting 3,500 feet out into the sea. It is a rugged and sharp igneous basaltic outcrop.

Cockscomb Point is the name of Pola Island's northernmost tip. It is formed by a ridge of indented, steep, and high rocks, creating a distinctive and rugged landscape. At the head of Vatia Bay, which is situated near Cockscomb Point, lies the village of Vatia.

=== Accessibility ===
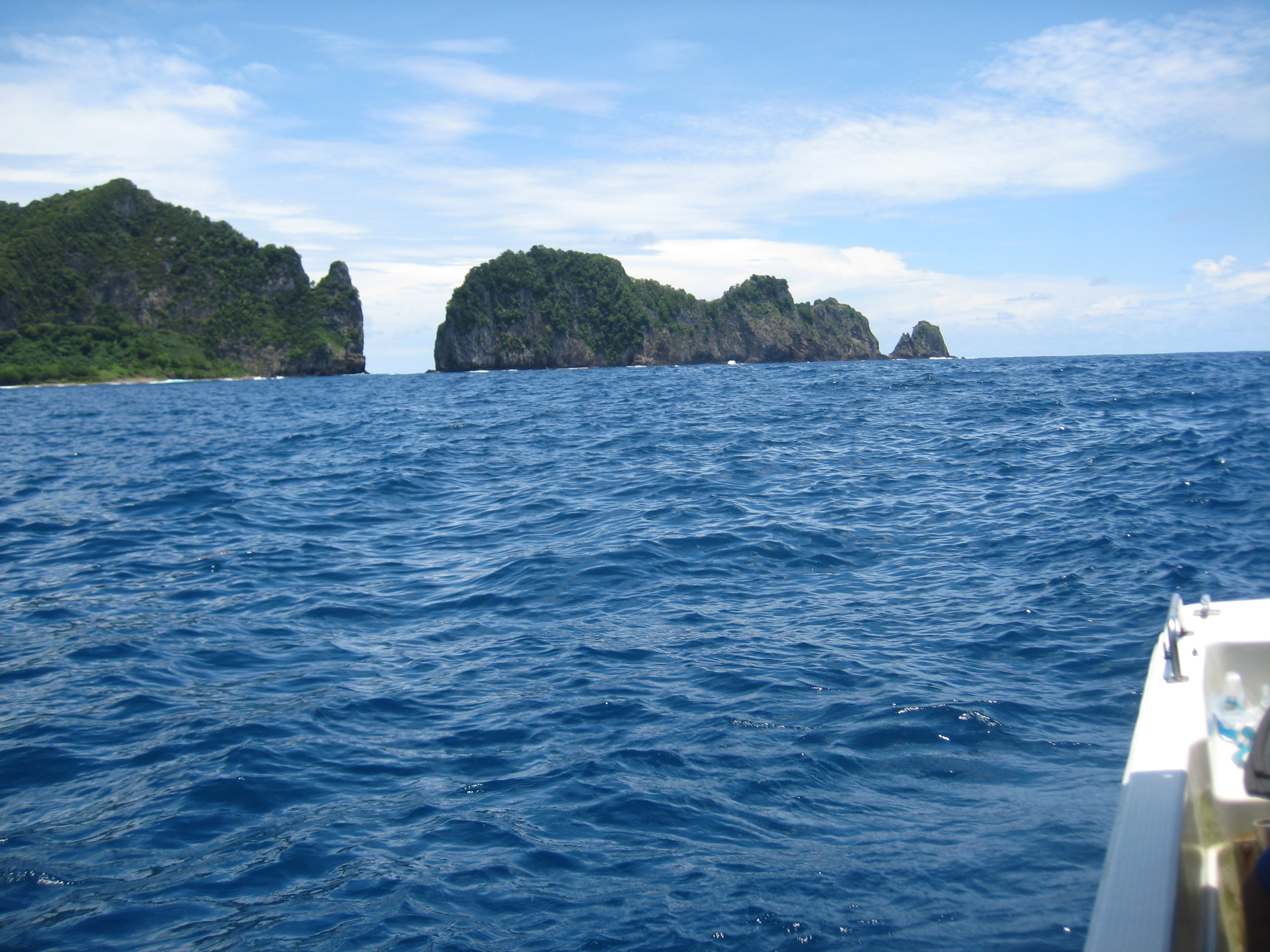
Eastern point of Vatia Bay.

Passing east through the village of Vatia, the Pola Island trailhead is located at the end of the road. The trailhead is beyond the school, and a short trail leads into the National Park. The trail ends at a rocky cliff which points across Vai'ava Strait to Pola Island. There is no access to the island itself.

Tour companies offer boat tours to see Pola Island.

== Climate ==
The rainfall in the area is from 149 to 252 inches (3,800 to 6,400 millimetres) annually. The temperature is around 71-73 degrees Fahrenheit.

== Wildlife ==
=== Avifauna ===
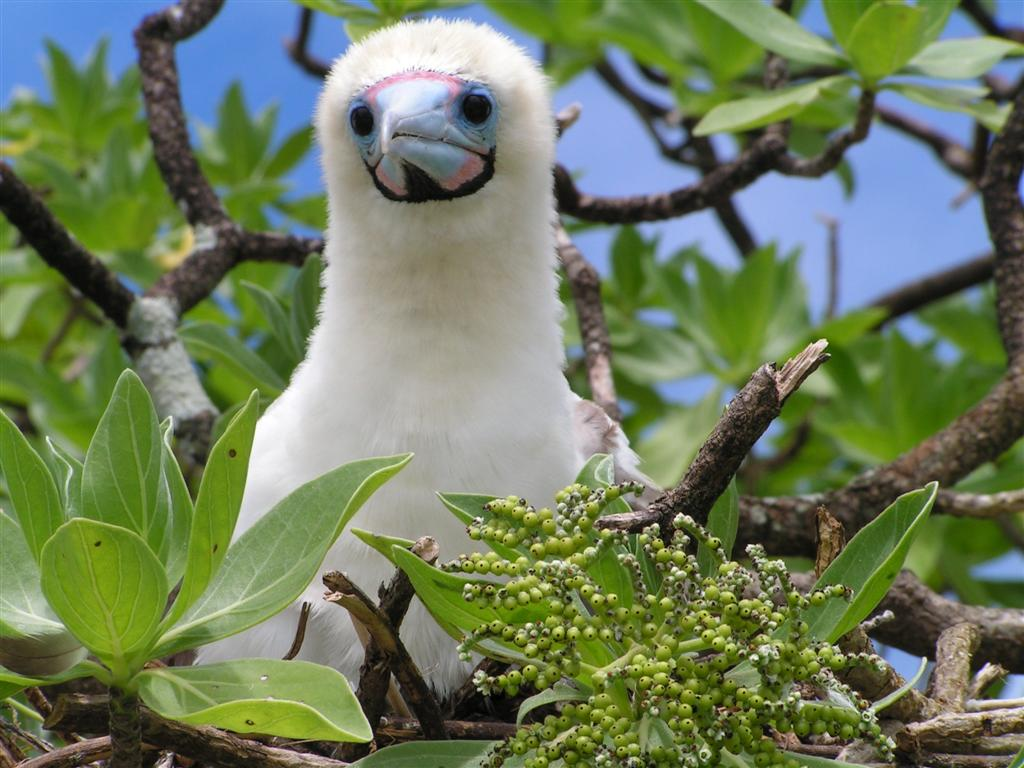
In American Samoa Red-footed boobies are only found in the Pola area and Rose Atoll.

The island has 394 feet high cliffs populated by seabirds. Pola Island has been described as American Samoa's "top seabird nesting site." Pola Island and nearby Pola'uta Ridge are American Samoa's most important nesting and roosting areas for several seabird species. The only breeding colonies of Red-footed boobies in American Samoa are Rose Atoll and Pola Island including nearby Pola'uta Ridge.

The Pola region of Vatia is the most important roosting and nesting sites in American Samoa for numerous species of seabirds. Some bird species here include:

- Red-footed booby (Sula sula)
- Brown booby (Sula leucogaster)
- Greater frigatebird (Fregata minor)
- Lesser frigatebird (Fregata ariel)
- Brown noddy (Anous stolidus)
- Black noddy (Anous minutus)
- Blue-gray noddy (Drocelstema cerulea)
- Gray-backed Tern (Stema lunata)

Bridled terns are rare visitors in American Samoa, however, they have been recorded at Pola Island. Pola Island is the primary breeding area for boobies and frigatebirds on Tutuila Island.

=== Hunting ===
Hunting of Brown boobies, known as A'ega o le Pola, was a tradition in the past. However, the birds were over-hunted due to the use of shotguns and remained gone from the Pola area until recently. The eggs from Brown boobies were considered a delicacy for nearby Vatia residents.
