= Vaiʻava Strait =

Strait in Vatia, American Samoa

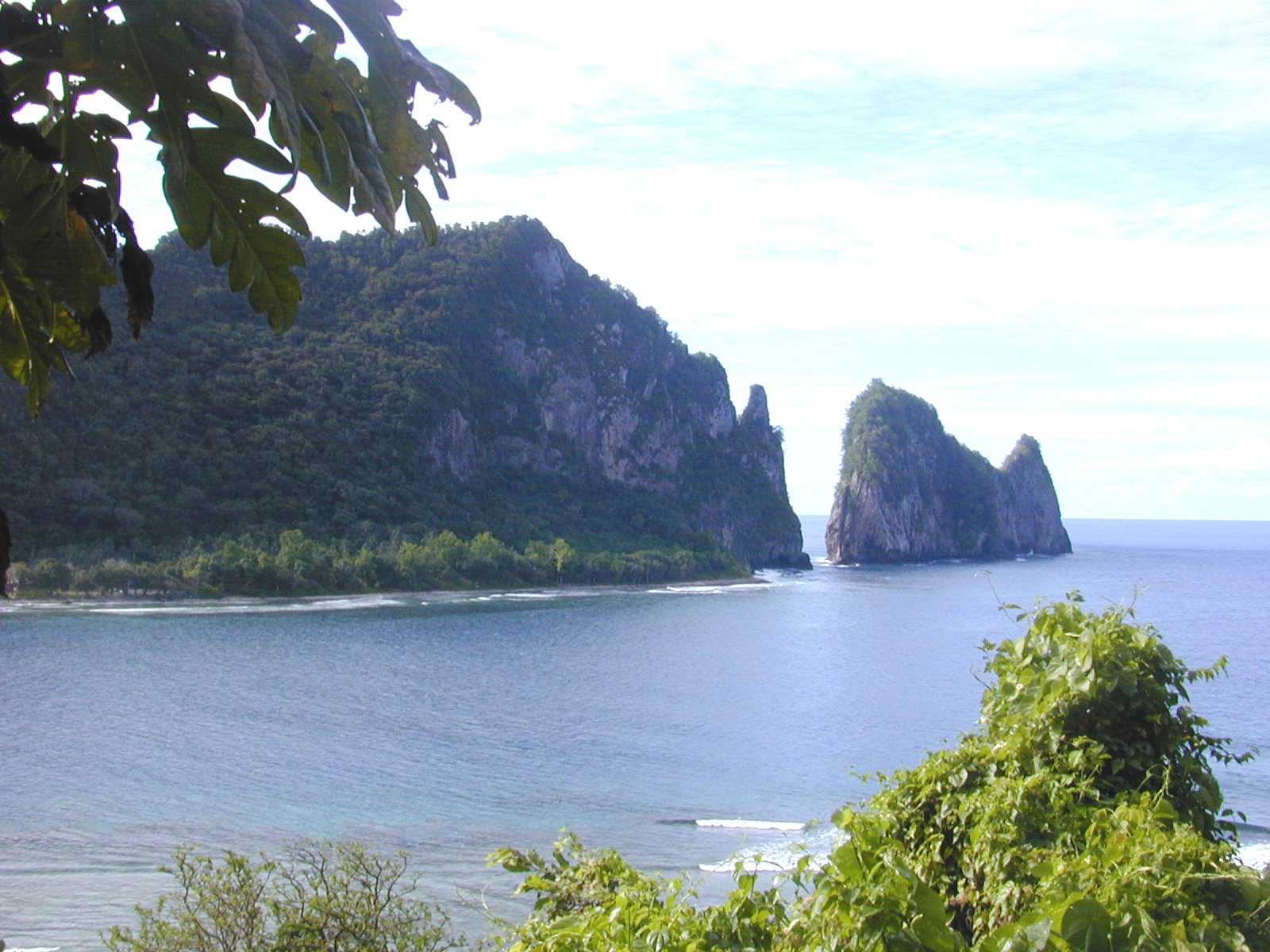
- Vaiʻava Strait National Natural Landmark

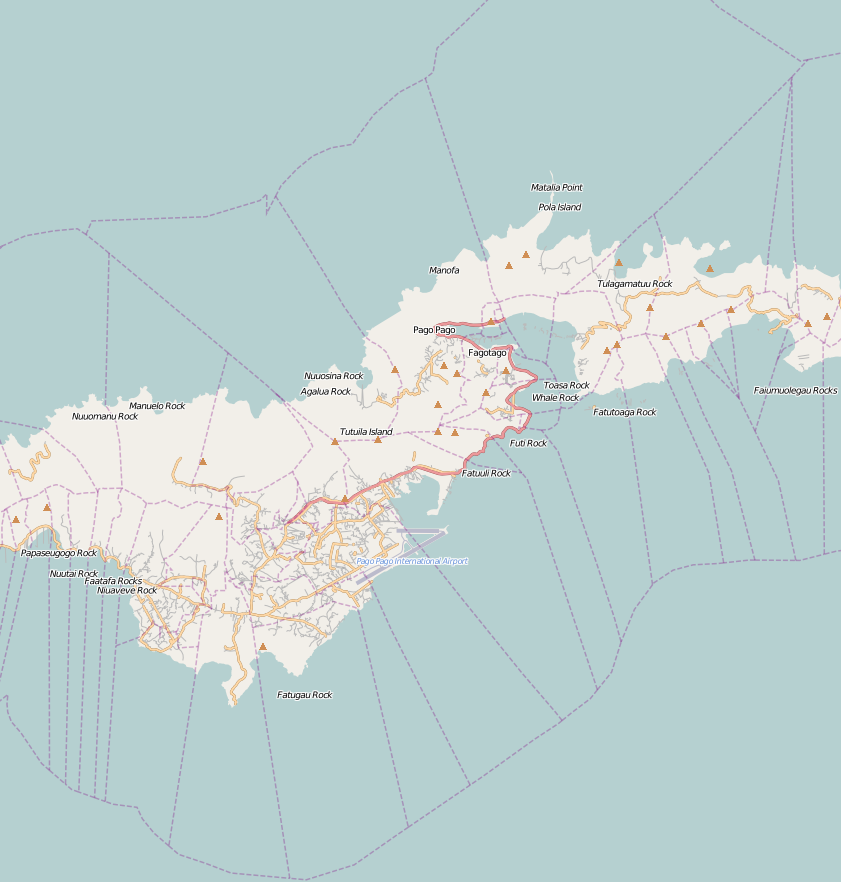
- Location within central American Samoa Location within American Samoa
- Location: American Samoa
- Nearest city: Vatia
- Coordinates: 14°14′19″S 170°40′17″W
- Area: 250 acres (100 ha)
- Designated: 1972
- Administrator: U.S. National Park Service

Vaiʻava Strait (Samoan: Vāinuʻu o Vaiʻava) is a narrow strait in Vatia, American Samoa which separates the 420-foot-high (130 m) Pola Island (Cock's Comb) from Polauta Ridge on adjacent Tutuila Island. The strait is a good example of cliffs formed by the erosional forces of waves on volcanic rock. The lands surrounding the strait are held communally. A 250-acre (100 ha) area surrounding the strait was designated a U.S. National Natural Landmark in 1972. It is also a part of the National Park of American Samoa.

Pola-Uta is connected to the village of Vatia on Tutuila Island. Pola Tai is a 400-foot (120 m) cliff that is an important nesting area for the fuaʻō (brown booby) and tavaʻe (white tailored tropic bird). Hunting of brown boobies, known as the Aʻega o le Pola, was a tradition carried out by Vatians in the past. Pola Tai includes Matalia Point, Cockscomb Point and Polauta Ridge.

== Gallery ==
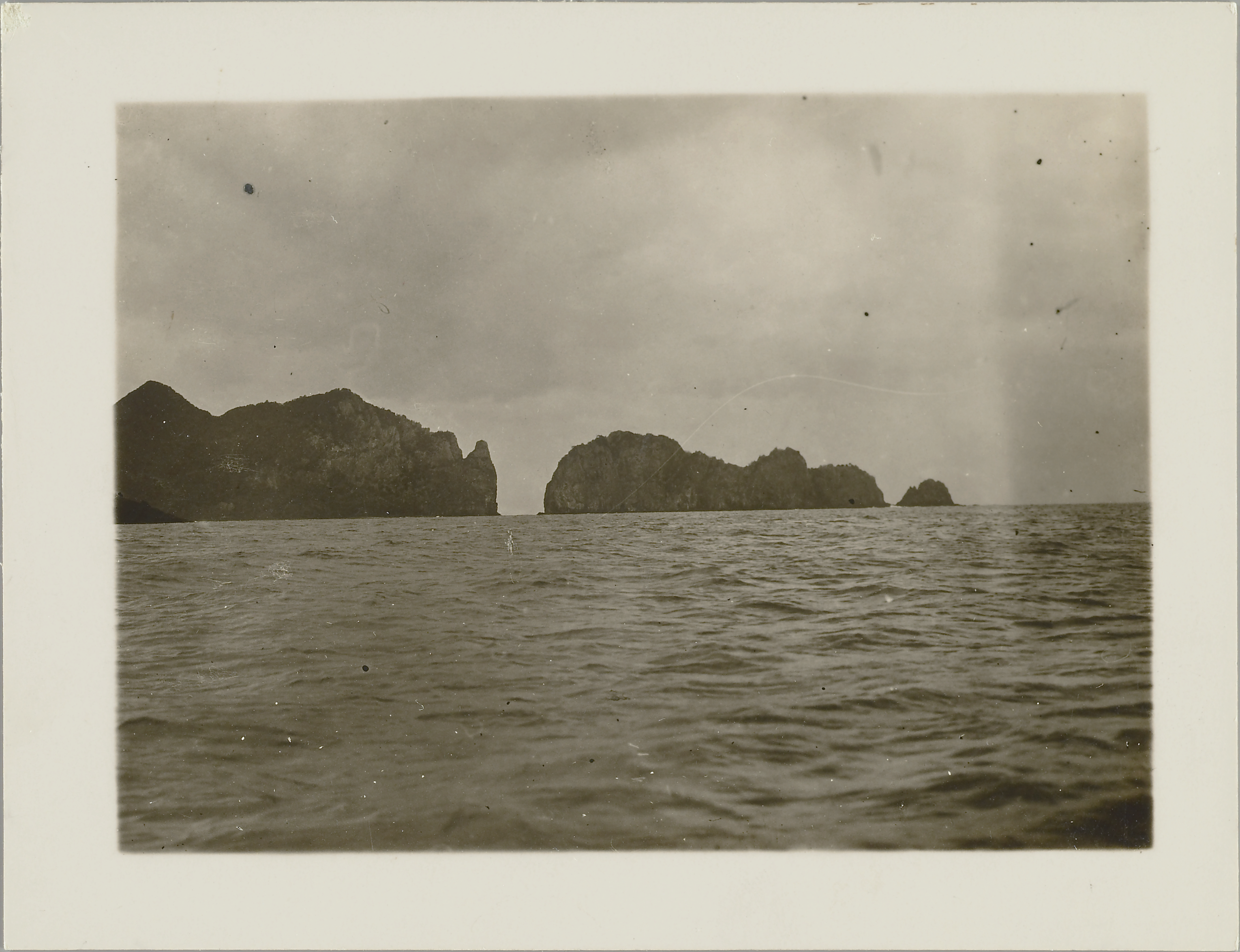
Vaiʻava Strait, 1907

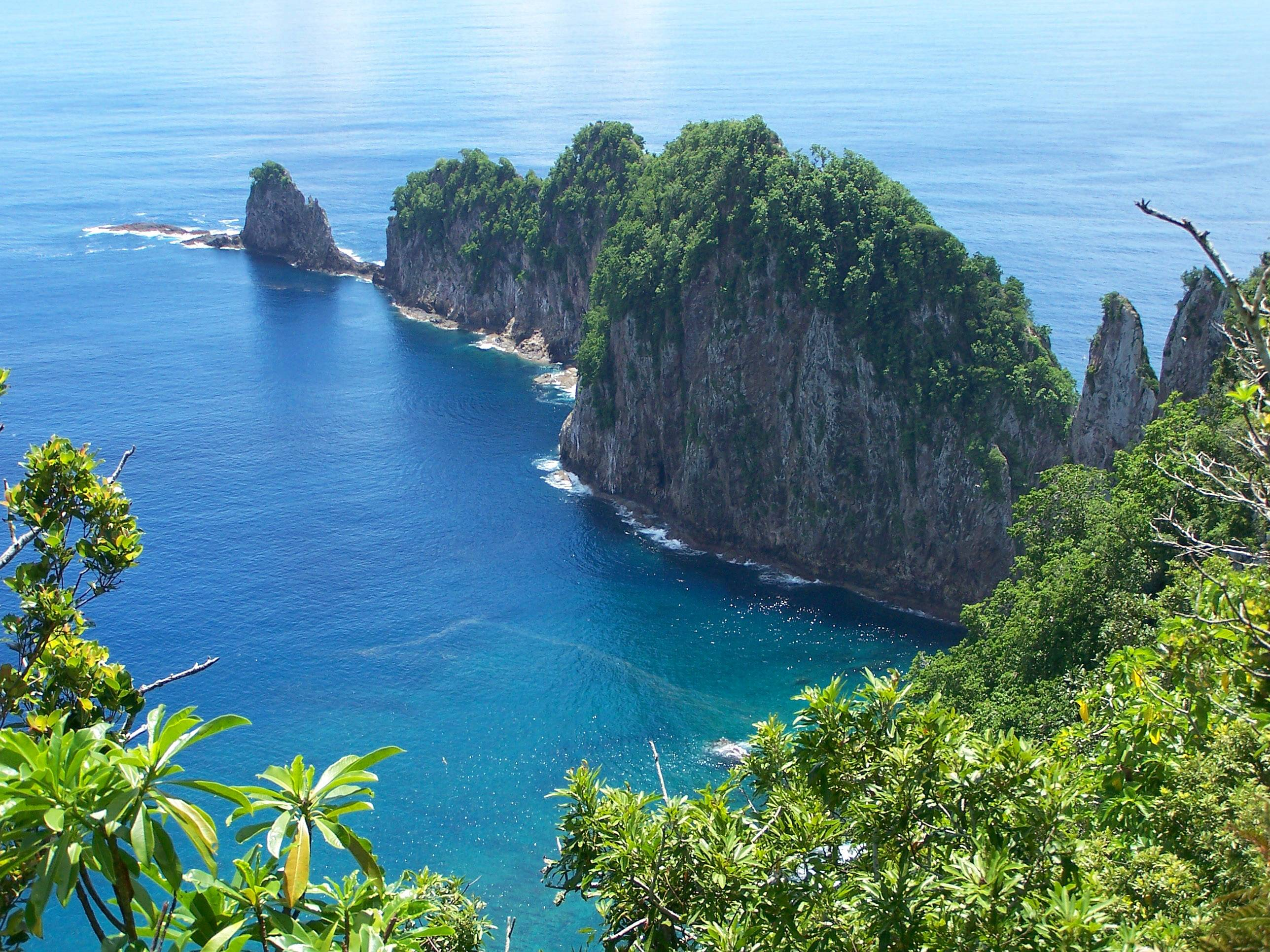
Pola Island

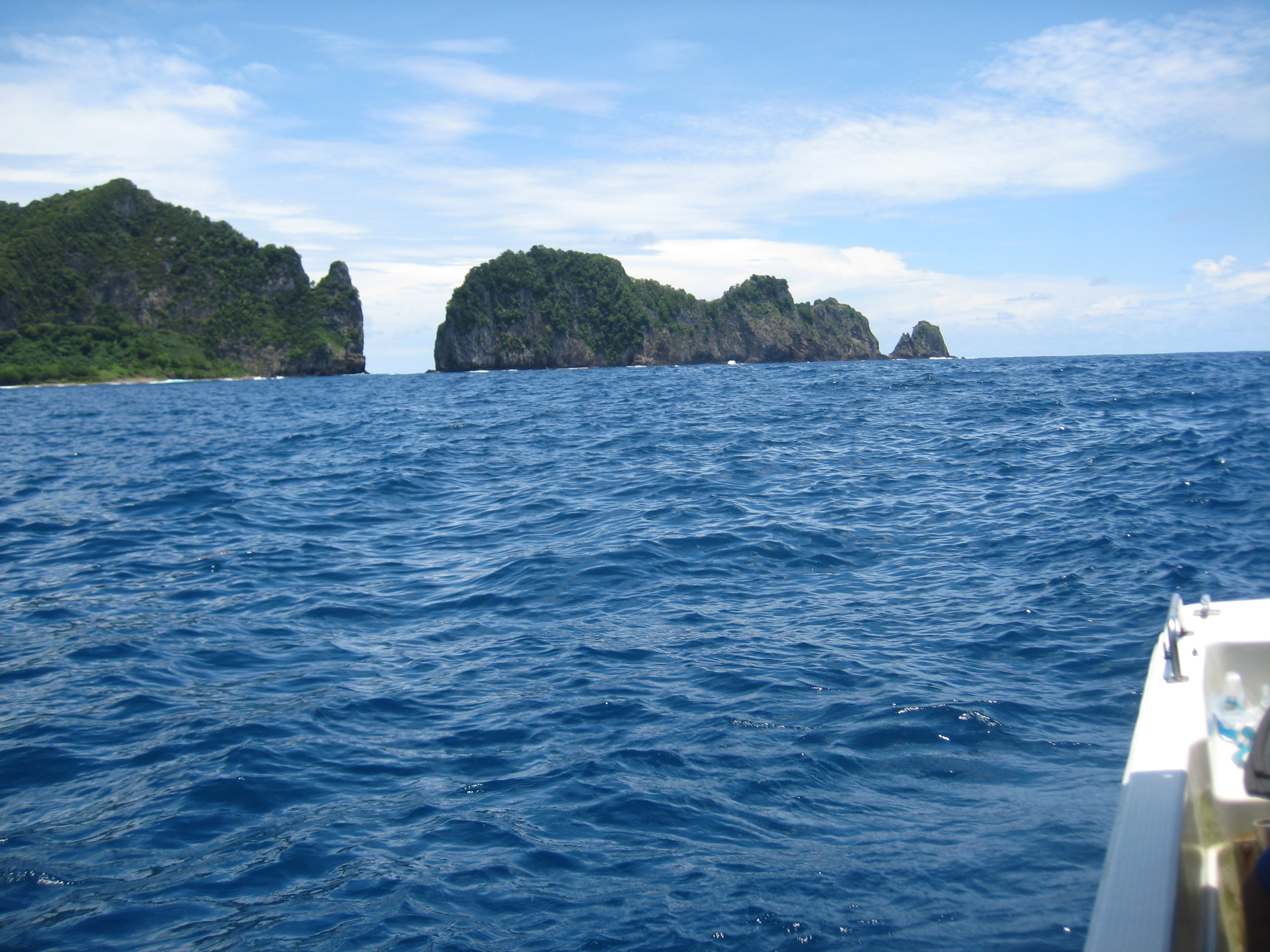
Eastern point of Vatia Bay

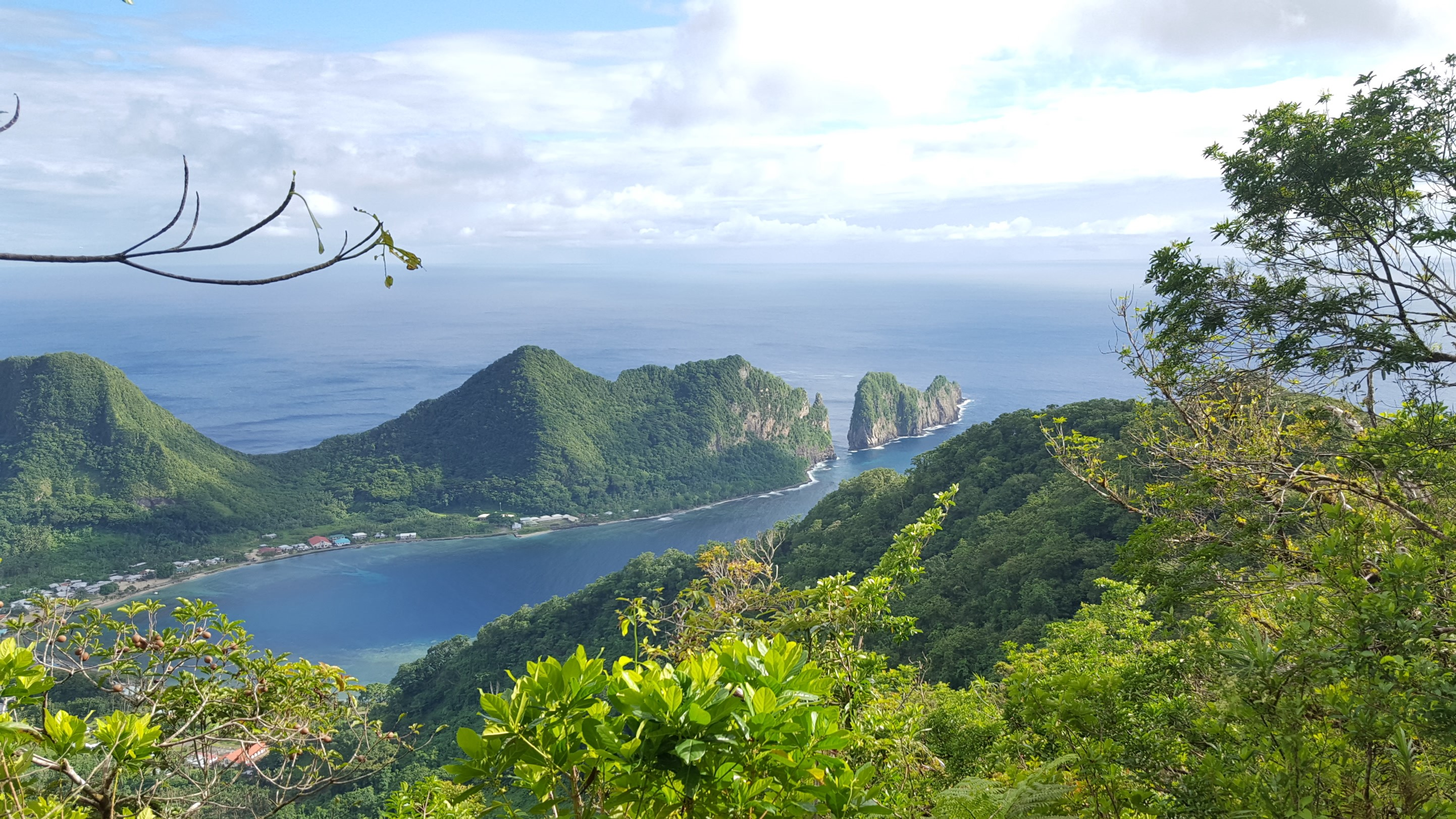
Polauta Ridge and Pola Island

== See also ==
- List of National Natural Landmarks in American Samoa
