= Old Vatia =

Prehistoric village site in American Samoa

- U.S. National Register of Historic Places
- Location within American Samoa
- Nearest city: Vatia, American Samoa
- Area: 1.8 acres (0.73 ha)
- Architectural style: Prehistoric House Foundation
- NRHP reference No.: 06000956
- Added to NRHP: November 2, 2006

Old Vatia is a prehistoric village site on the north side of Tutuila, the largest island of American Samoa. The site is located on the Faiga Ridge, above and southwest of the modern village of Vatia (a name meaning "between the tombs of those with paramount status"), within the National Park of American Samoa. Believed to have been occupied from approximately 1300 to 1750 AD, it is one of Tutuila's few upland village sites and has been described as "probably the largest ridgetop site in American Samoa." The site was listed on the National Register of Historic Places on November 2, 2006.

== Description ==
The site is stretched linearly along Faiga Ridge, with terraced areas containing stone house foundations and pavement. The house platforms are raised on small earthen mounds and ringed with basalt boulders. Archaeological excavations in the 1980s uncovered remnants of various structures, including one house foundation constructed from coral slabs that may have served as a ceremonial center, temple, or communal meeting house. According to the National Park Service, the well-preserved archaeological features at Old Vatia "help interpret the history and prehistory of the Polynesian Samoans." Because the site lies within the national park, forest clearance is restricted, and dense tropical vegetation now surrounds the ruins.

== History ==
Old Vatia was first rediscovered in 1963 by archaeologist William K. Kikuchi, but was not investigated further until the 1980s. It was subsequently recorded in detail in 1989 by the Eastern Tutuila Archaeology Project, which characterized it as probably the largest ridgetop settlement in the territory.

The village is believed to have been abandoned by around 1750. Across the Samoan Islands, the arrival of London Missionary Society missionaries beginning in 1830 accelerated a broader shift from inland to coastal settlement, and the modern village of Vatia was established on the coast below the ridge.

== See also ==
- National Register of Historic Places listings in American Samoa
- National Park of American Samoa
- Archaeology of Samoa
