= Vatia, American Samoa =

Vatia
- Village
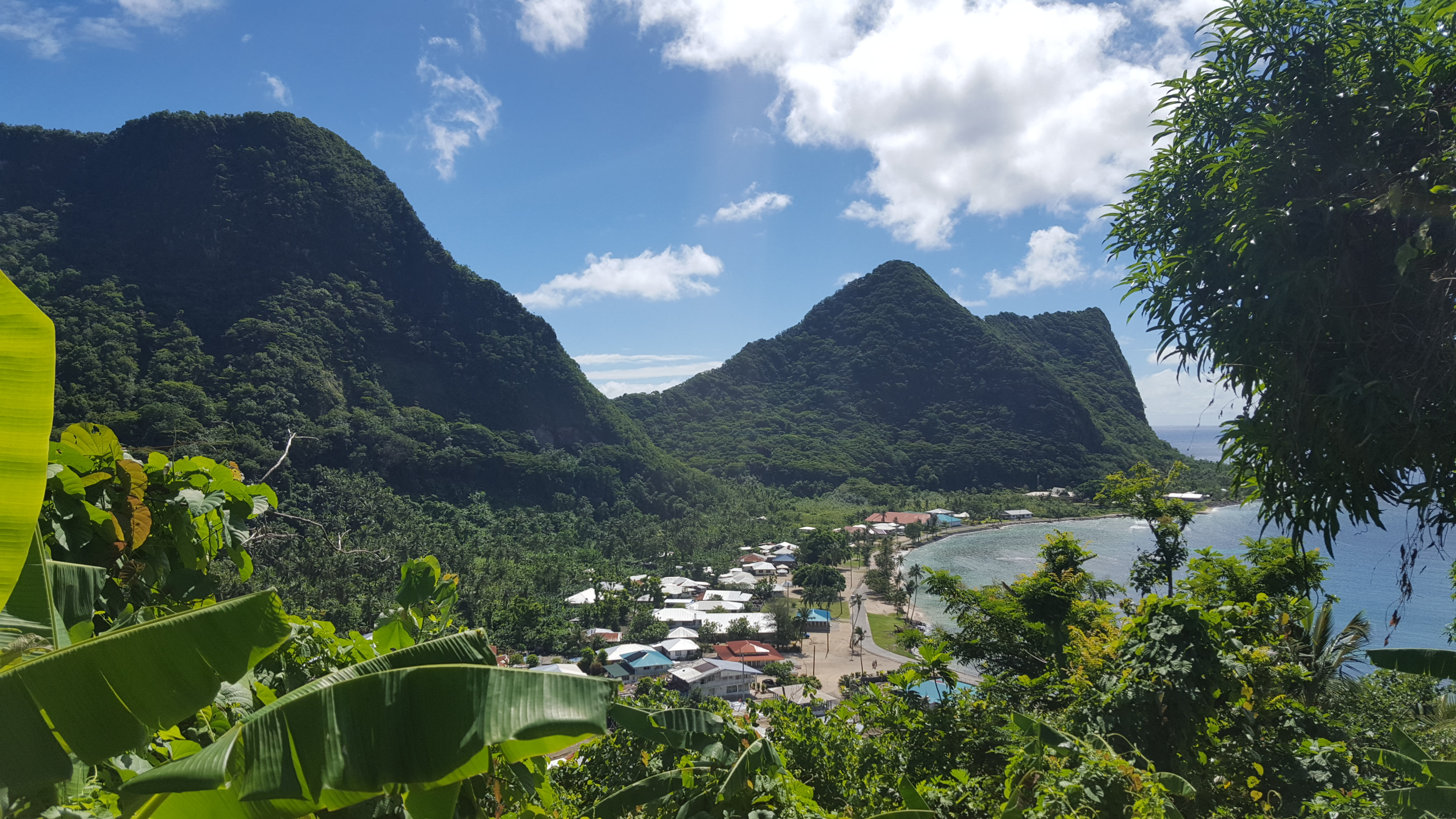
- Vatia from the Tuafanua Trail in the National Park of American Samoa
- Etymology: Samoan: "between the tombs of those with paramount status"
- Location within American Samoa
- Coordinates: 14°15′03″S 170°40′33″W
- Country: United States
- Territory: American Samoa
- Island: Tutuila Island
- Named for: Samoan mythology

Government
  - Mayor: Sale'aumua Tevi

Area
  - Land: 2.50 sq mi (6.5 km^{2})

Population (2020)
  - Total: 460
  - Density: 256.2/sq mi (98.9/km^{2})
- Demonym: Vatian
- Time zone: UTC−11 (Samoa Time Zone)
- ZIP Code: 96799
- Area code: +1 684

Vatia is a village on Tutuila Island in American Samoa. It is a north shore village located on Vatia Bay. The road to Vatia, American Samoa Highway 006, is the only road going through National Park of American Samoa. Vatia is a scenic community at the foot of Pola Ridge and surrounded by the national park. It is only reached by Route 6 which traverses the national park before reaching Vatia. There was once a hiking trail over Maugaloa Ridge from Leloaloa, but since the completion of Route 6, this trail is now overgrown. It is home to a beach, and panoramic views of jungle-covered peaks surround the village on all sides. Vatia is the center of the Tutuila-section of National Park of American Samoa. It is located in Vaifanua County.

Vatia is home to several concrete bunkers from World War II located on and around the beach. The scenic road between Vatia and Afono is lined with gardens of ornamental plants and flowers. At the end of the road in Vatia is the school, and beyond the school begins a trail leading into the national park. It ends at a rocky cliff which points across Vai'ava Strait to Pola Island. Many Vatians work at the canneries in Pago Pago, and there is good public transportation to and from Pago Pago. Aiga buses from Fagatogo head to Vatia several times per day on weekdays. The village of Vatia can also be visited by hiking Mount ‘Alava.

Vatia is one of the oldest settlements on Tutuila Island and it has historically been regarded as the principal place of eastern Tutuila. Vatia dwells around Vatia Bay which is protected and surrounded by green forested mountains and rich coastal reefs on its seafront.

Vatia Bay has been described as Tutuila Island's most scenic area. A steep ridge curves around the village's west side and leads to Pola Island, which has been claimed to be the most photographed site on Tutuila Island. Pola Island is the most popular attraction in the village.

== Etymology ==
Vatia literally translates to “between the tombs of those with paramount status.”

== History ==
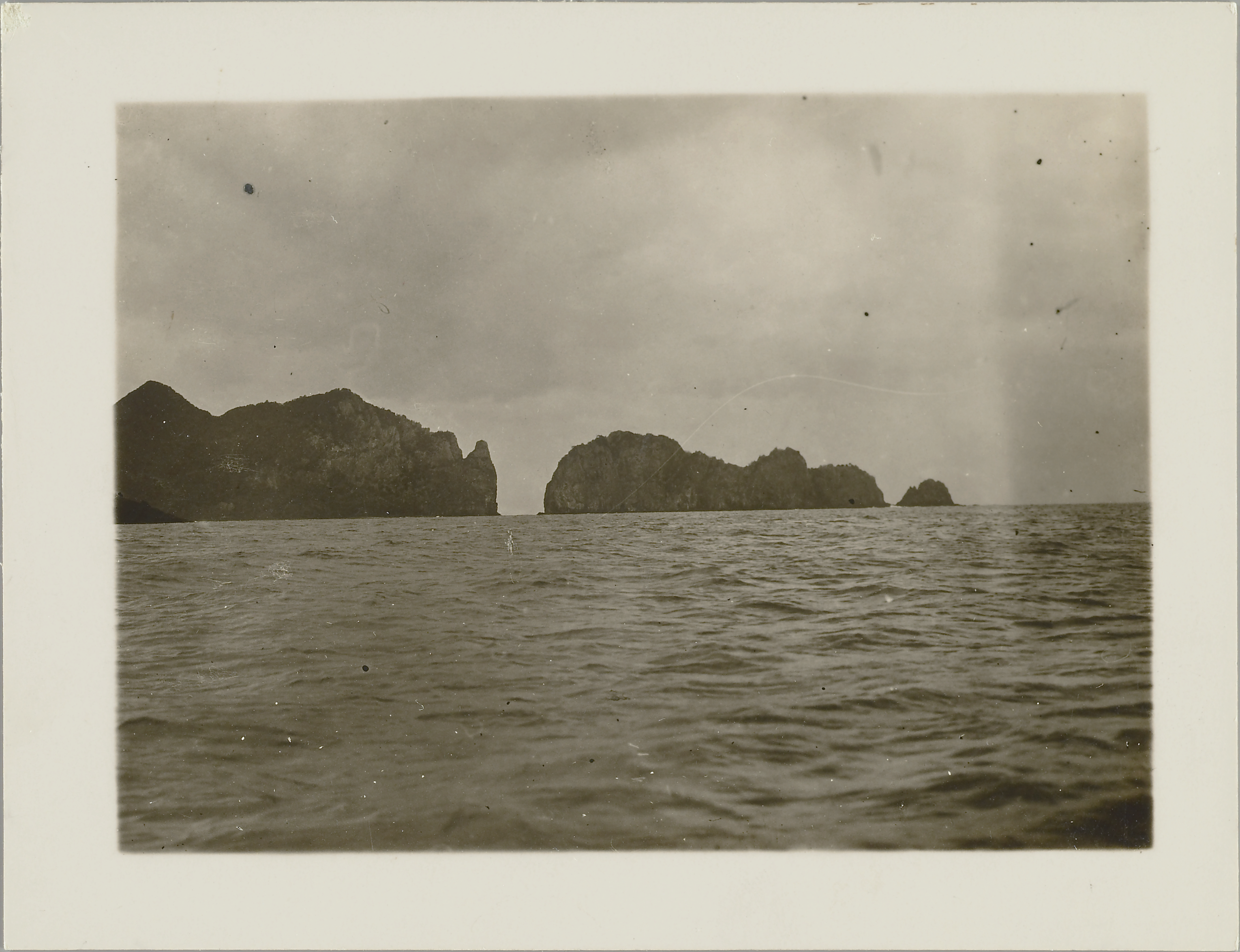
Pola Tai and Pola Uta, 1907

Vatia is one of the oldest villages on Tutuila Island. The original Vatians lived on a narrow ridge known as Toafaiga as far back as the 18th century. In the 1980s, archeologists from the National Park Service documented the findings of remnants of different architectural structures and house foundations on the ridge. One archeological finding was that of a house foundation which was constructed of coral slaps. This may have been a ceremonial center, temple, or a meeting house for the village.

Remains found in Old Vatia have been dated to between 1300 AD to 1750 AD. The historic house platforms are raised on small earthen mounds and ringed with basalt boulders. Old Vatia has provided archeological remains with well-preserved archeological features, which, according to the National Park Service, “help interpret the history and prehistory of the Polynesian Samoans.” As it is located within the National Park of American Samoa, forest clearance is restricted, leaving Old Vatia surrounded by dense vegetation. On November 2, 2006, it was added to the U.S. National Register of Historic Places (AS-24-002).

Old Vatia is located on Faiga Ridge, above and southwest of Vatia. The site was first re-discovered in 1963 by William K. Kikuchi, but it was not investigated until the 1980s. It was first recorded by the Eastern Tutuila Archeology Project, which noted that Old Vatia is “probably the largest ridgetop site in American Samoa.”

In 1830, with the arrival of Christianity, people began relocating to the present site of Vatia.

In 1889, a branch of the LDS Church was opened at Vatia.

In 1900, following the conclusion of the Second Samoan Civil War, Benjamin Franklin Tilley returned to American Samoa and deemed it essential to visit Vatia. There, two chiefs had openly resisted his authority. Governor Tilley presented them with an ultimatum: either cease their defiance or face removal. As the majority of Tutuilans had grown weary of conflict, he garnered the support of the community.

Apollo 11 returned to Earth in 1969 in the waters nearby Vatia. A copy of the American Samoan flag, which was brought to the moon by Apollo 11, is on display at the Jean P. Haydon Museum in Pago Pago.

== Geography ==
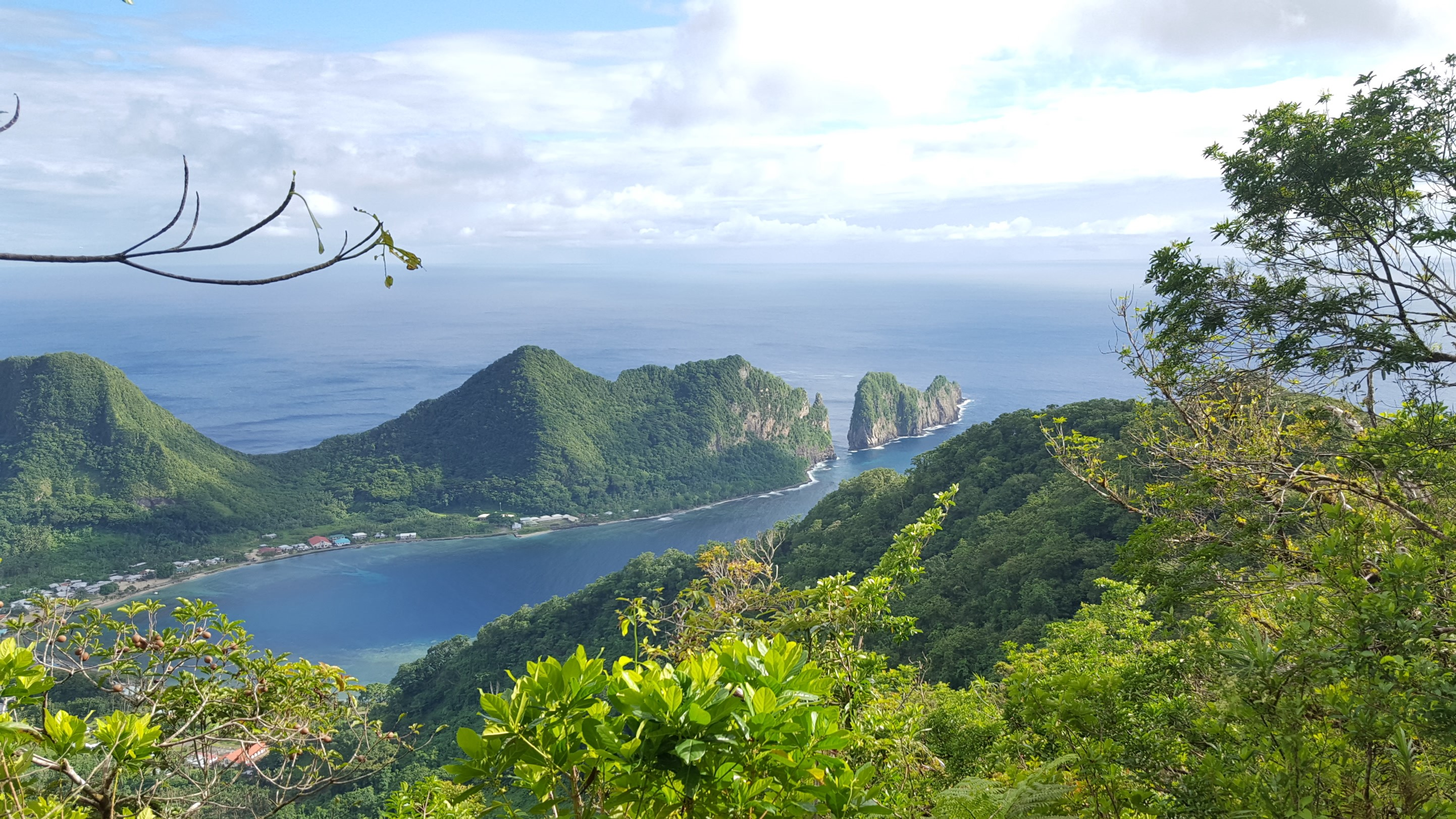
Polauta Ridge and Pola Island

Vatia is located on an edge of the wide, coral-fringed Vatia Bay. Vatia's location on the northern coast separates the village from the more populated places on the island. It is around ten miles northeast of Pago Pago. A drive through the village takes you through green forested mountains, lush rainforests, and the Pacific coast. A site along the road into Vatia is the Pola Scenic Point, which overlooks Pola Island and Vai'ava Strait National Natural Landmark. Vatia is separated from the south shore villages by mountain ridges and steep valleys. Years ago, hiking through the mountains and valleys on narrow pathways was the only way to reach or leave the village. Pola Island is a landmark and icon for Vatia. It stands on the west side of Vatia Bay. The island has been named one of the Seven Natural Wonders of American Samoa by the Pago Pages.

== National Park ==
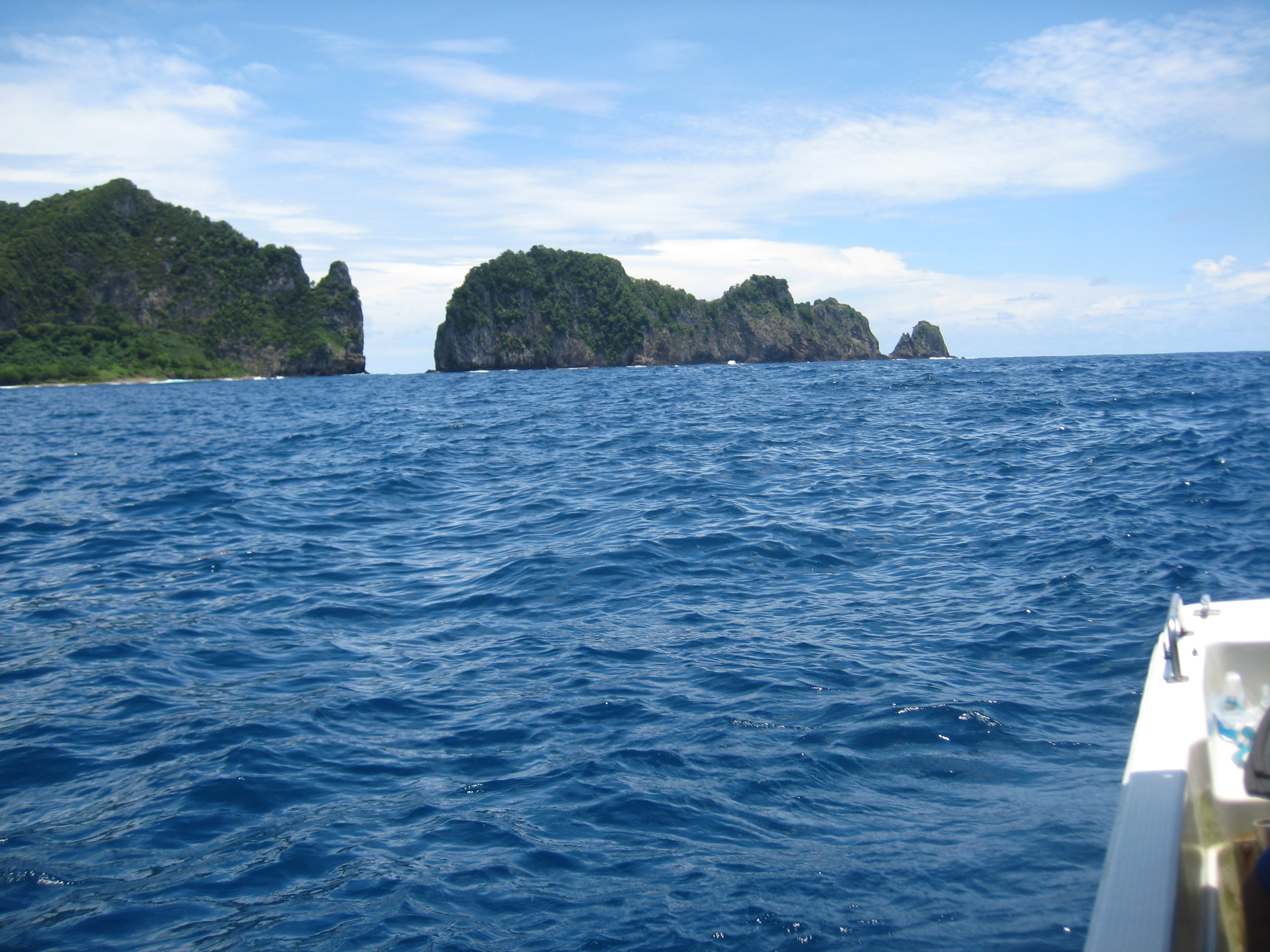
Eastern point of Vatia Bay

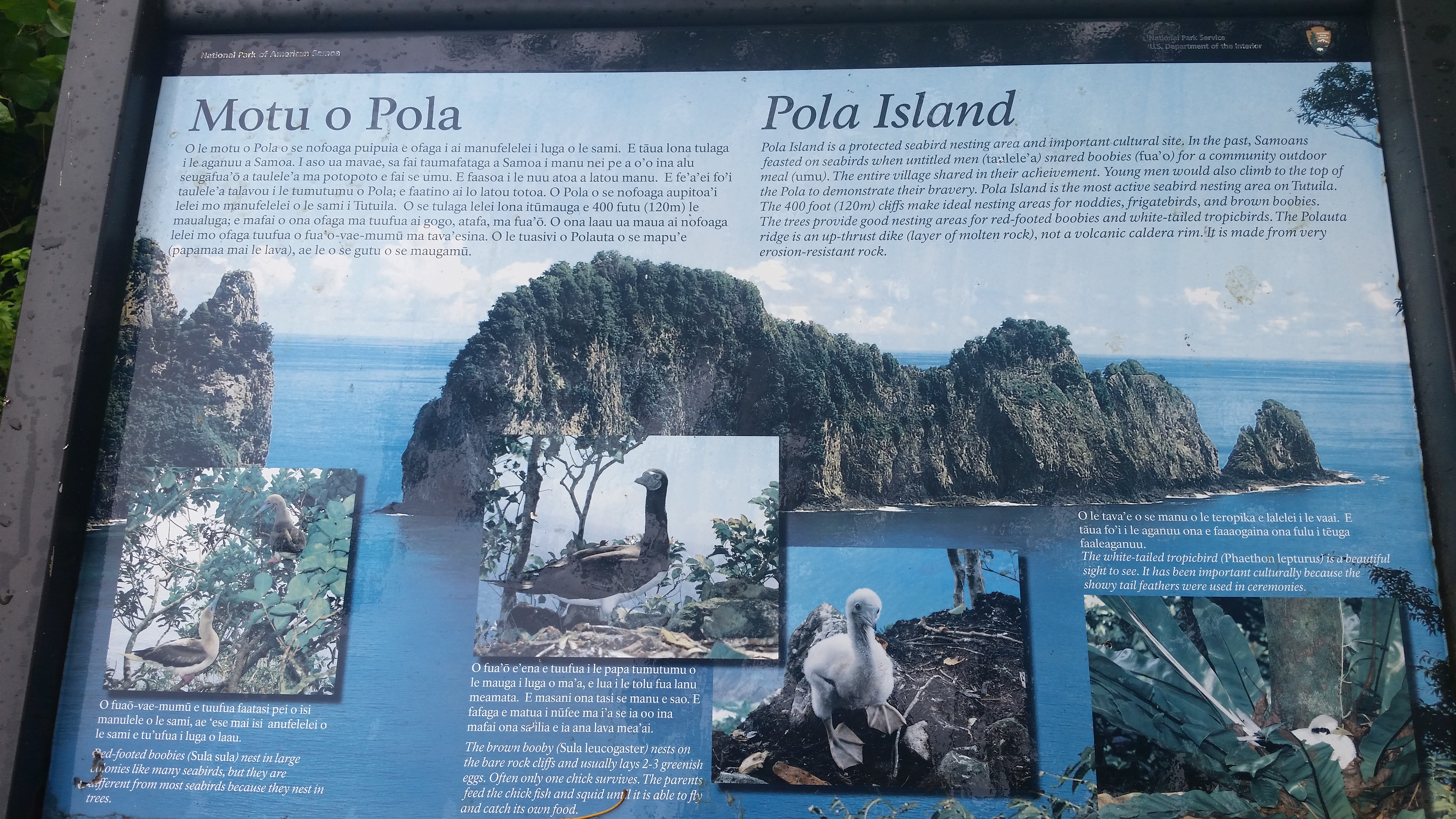
National Park sign for Pola Island.

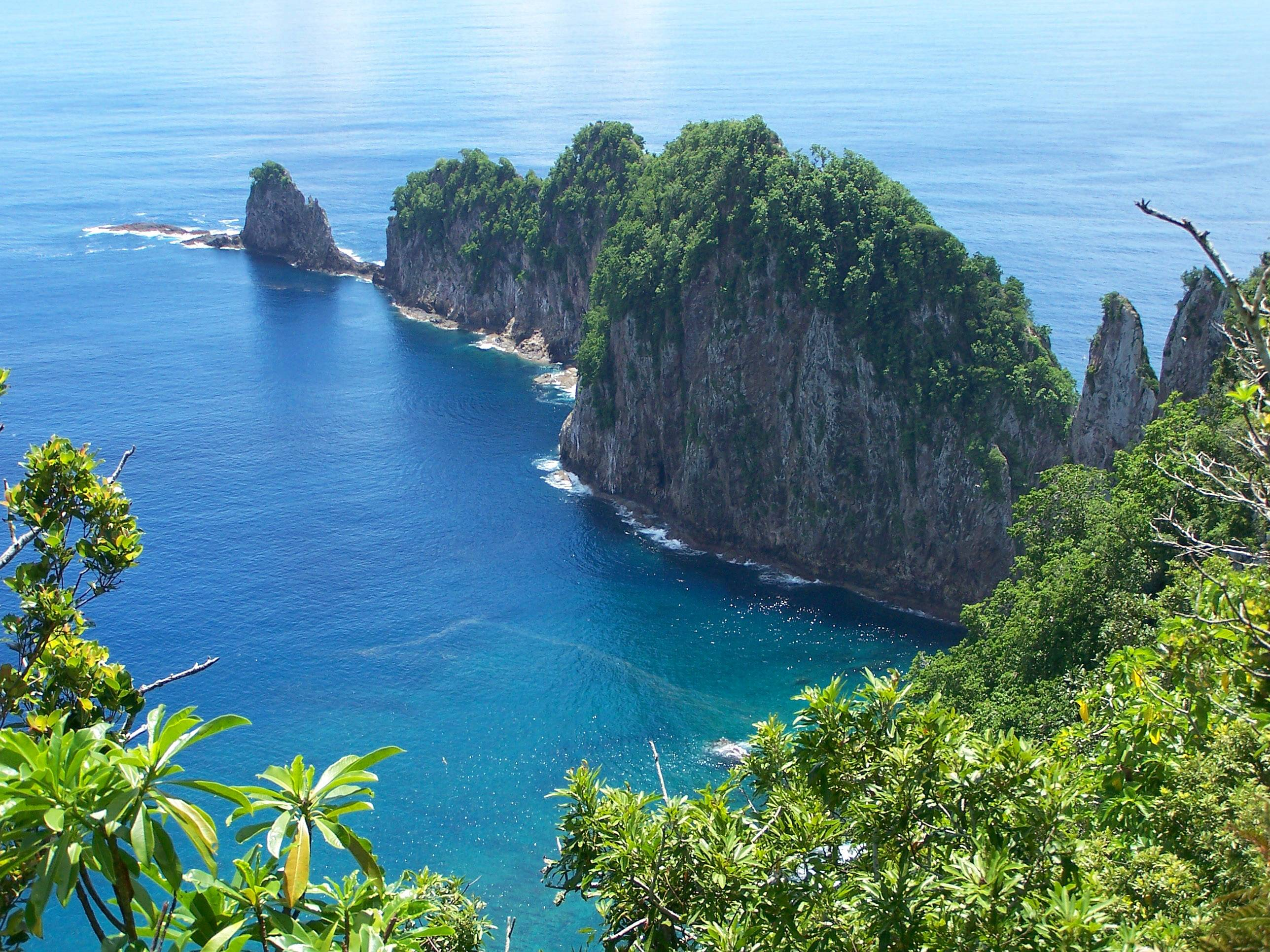
View of Pola Island from the Tuafanua Trail.

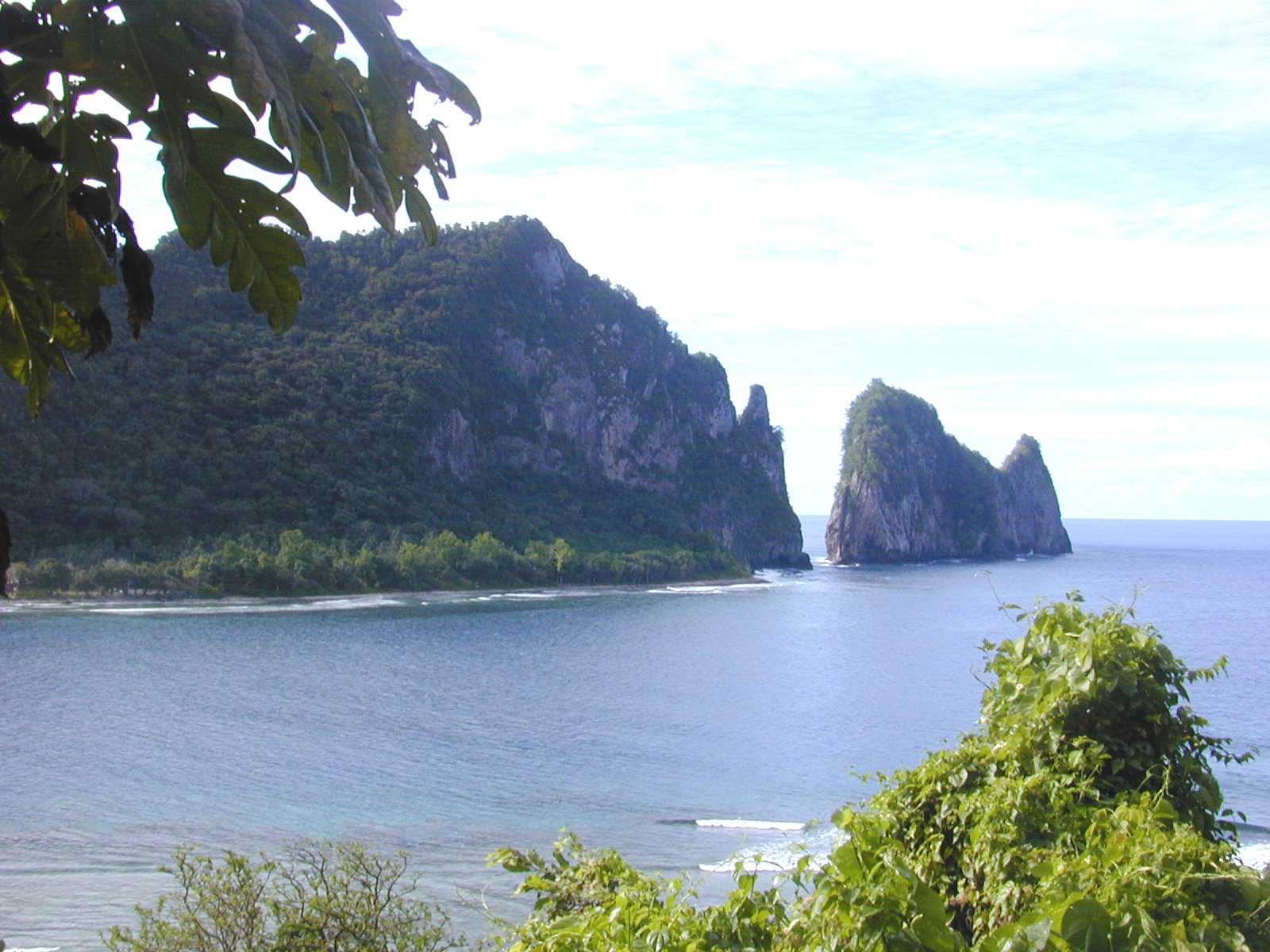
Vai'ava Strait National Natural Landmark.

Vatia serves as the center for the Tutuila-section of American Samoa National Park. Tuafanua Trail is a 2.2-mile trail which is located in National Park of American Samoa. The trail follows switchbacks through the rainforest from Vatia and up to the top of a nearby mountain ridge. From the top of the ridge, there are great views of Vai'ava Strait National Natural Landmark and nearby Pola Island (Cockscomb). The trail continues down to a rocky beach. Tuafanua Trailhead is situated just before Mount ‘Alava Elementary School in Vatia. Tuafanua Trail leads through one of the three rain forests found in the National Park. The flora here is a mixture of native bushes, ferns, and trees.

Lower Sauma Ridge Trail is another hiking trail through National Park land. This interpretive trail begins at a scenic overlook point on the road to Vatia. The trail leads to an archeological site of an ancient star mound. Along the trail are exhibits and views of the Vai'ava Strait National Natural Landmark and Pola Island, which is a nesting area for seabirds. Lower Sauma Ridge Trail is a 0.4-mile roundtrip hike.

Boat tours arranged by the government regularly sail around the north coast villages of Vatia, Fagasā, and Āfono.

=== Pola Island ===
Pola Island (Pola Tai) is one of the most popular attractions in the national park. Pola Island and nearby Pola'uta Ridge have the only known breeding colonies of Red-footed Boobies in American Samoa outside Rose Atoll. The oceans surrounding the island have a regular presence of sharks. Villagers have accessed the islet in the past and planted a coconut tree. North Shore Tours offer boat tours to Pola Island.

=== Vai'ava Strait ===
Vai'ava Strait National Natural Landmark makes up 250 acres on the northwestern side of Vatia. It is the only U.S. National Natural Landmark in American Samoa which is also part of the National Park of American Samoa. Pola Island, a 420-foot tower-like islet, creates the north side of the strait. Passing east through the town of Vatia, the road ends at the Pola Island Trailhead. A short path leads to a large cobblestone beach. Two sea arches are visible from the base of the cliffs extending into the ocean.

=== Mount 'Alava ===
Mount ‘Alava Adventure Trail is a challenging 5.6-mile roundtrip hiking trail, which is situated across the road from the trailhead for Lower Sauma Ridge Trail. This loop goes along the ridges of Mount ‘Alava to the mountain summit. It has a total of 56 ladders and 783 steps. The trail goes down another in another section and ends in Vatia Village, before it loops back along the road to its trailhead.

== Population ==
Year	Population
2020	460
2010	640
2000	648
1990	608
1980	394
1970	391
1960	333
1950	273
1940	213
1930	160

Vatia has an estimated population of 640 as of late 2010. This is an increase of around 60% since 1980. Vatia had a median age of 22, and over 60% of the village's population was between 0 and 45 years old. Many residents work for the government of American Samoa and the private sector. Many are also employed with the canneries in the Pago Pago area.

=== Religion ===
Congregational Christian Church in American Samoa (CCCAS) is the main religion in Vatia, although there are members of Assemblies of God, The Church of Jesus Christ of Latter-Day Saints, Methodism and the Voice of Christ Full Gospel Church, Inc.

== Education ==
American Samoa Department of Education operates public schools, including Mount Alava Elementary.

== Wildlife ==
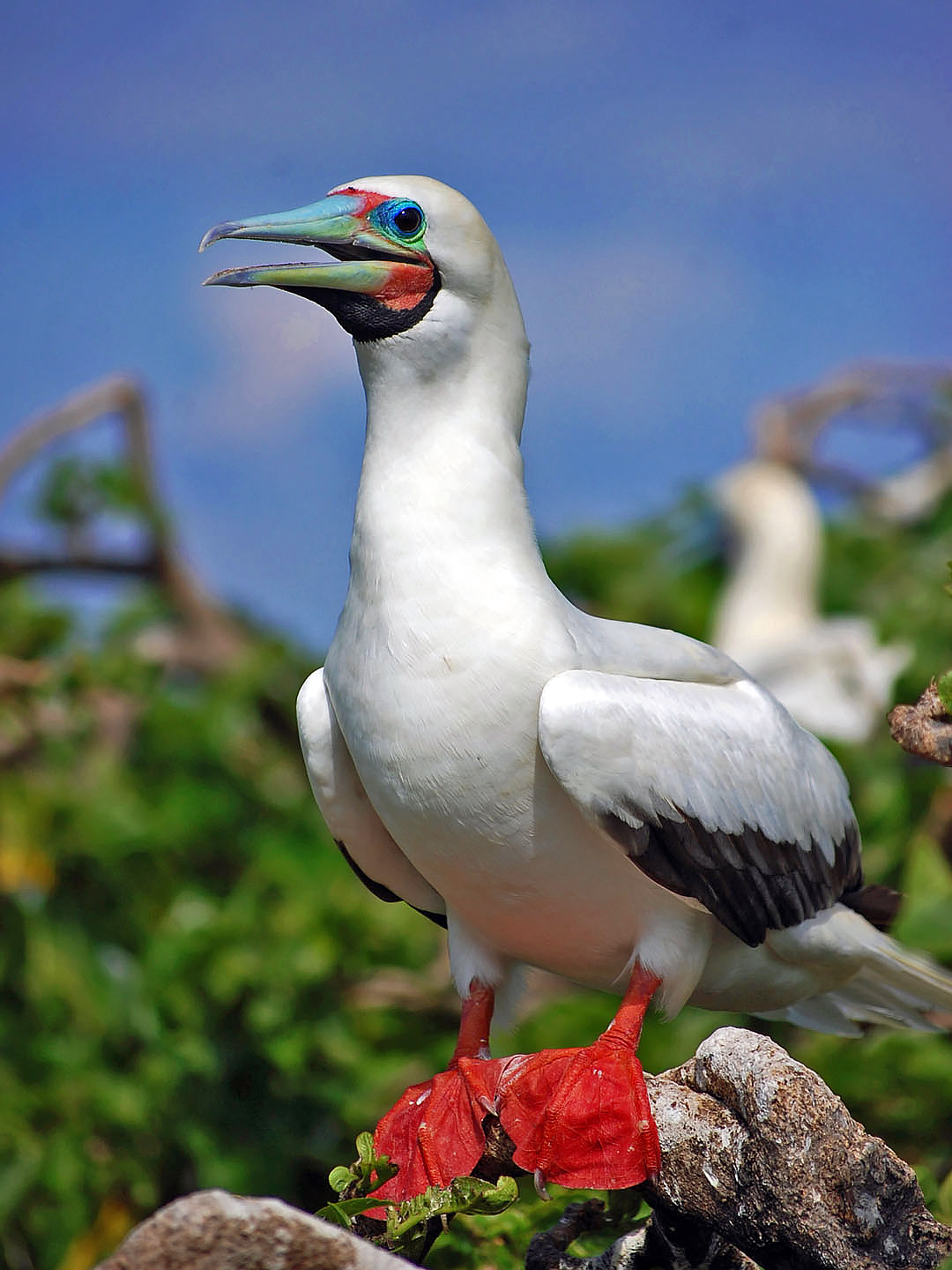
Red-footed booby (fua'ō)

Pola Island and Pola Uta Ridge in Vatia are vital nesting sites for a variety of seabirds and are excellent areas for observing noddies, frigatebirds, and boobies. Species such as the Red-footed booby and Brown booby breed on Pola Island, with the Red-footed booby also nesting on Pola Uta Ridge. Both the Lesser frigatebird and the Great frigatebird have roosting and possibly nesting colonies on Pola Island and Pola Uta Ridge. The Wedge-tailed shearwater, though rare in American Samoa, may nest in the cliffs of Pola Island. Uncommon residents like the Black noddy and Blue-gray noddy have been found nesting on Pola Island. Additionally, the Gray-backed tern and the Many-colored fruit dove have been observed in this area.

Rose Atoll and the Pola region of Vatia are the only places in American Samoa where Red-footed Boobies are found. Other species here include frigatebirds, white terns, tropicbirds, and noddy terns.

Pola Island and the nearby Polauta Ridge are the most important nesting and roosting areas in American Samoa for several bird species. Some bird species here include:

- Red-footed booby (Sula sula)
- Brown booby (Sula leucogaster)
- Greater frigatebird (Fregata minor)
- Lesser frigatebird (Fregata ariel)
- Brown noddy (Anous stolidus)
- Black noddy (Anous minutus)
- Blue-gray noddy (Drocelstema cerulea)
- Gray-backed Tern (Stema lunata)

== Sports ==
The men's and women's cricket teams were competitors in the Annual Flag Day Cricket League for many decades. Both teams have fashioned the namesake of Manu'ula. They have championed many flag day leagues over the years. The local village bird fua'ō (Red-footed booby) was adapted to the namesake of the village's longboat. In 2012, the village's new longboat was christened and entered the Annual Flag Day Fautasi Race. In 2013, the Fua'ō won the championship race.

== Points of interest ==
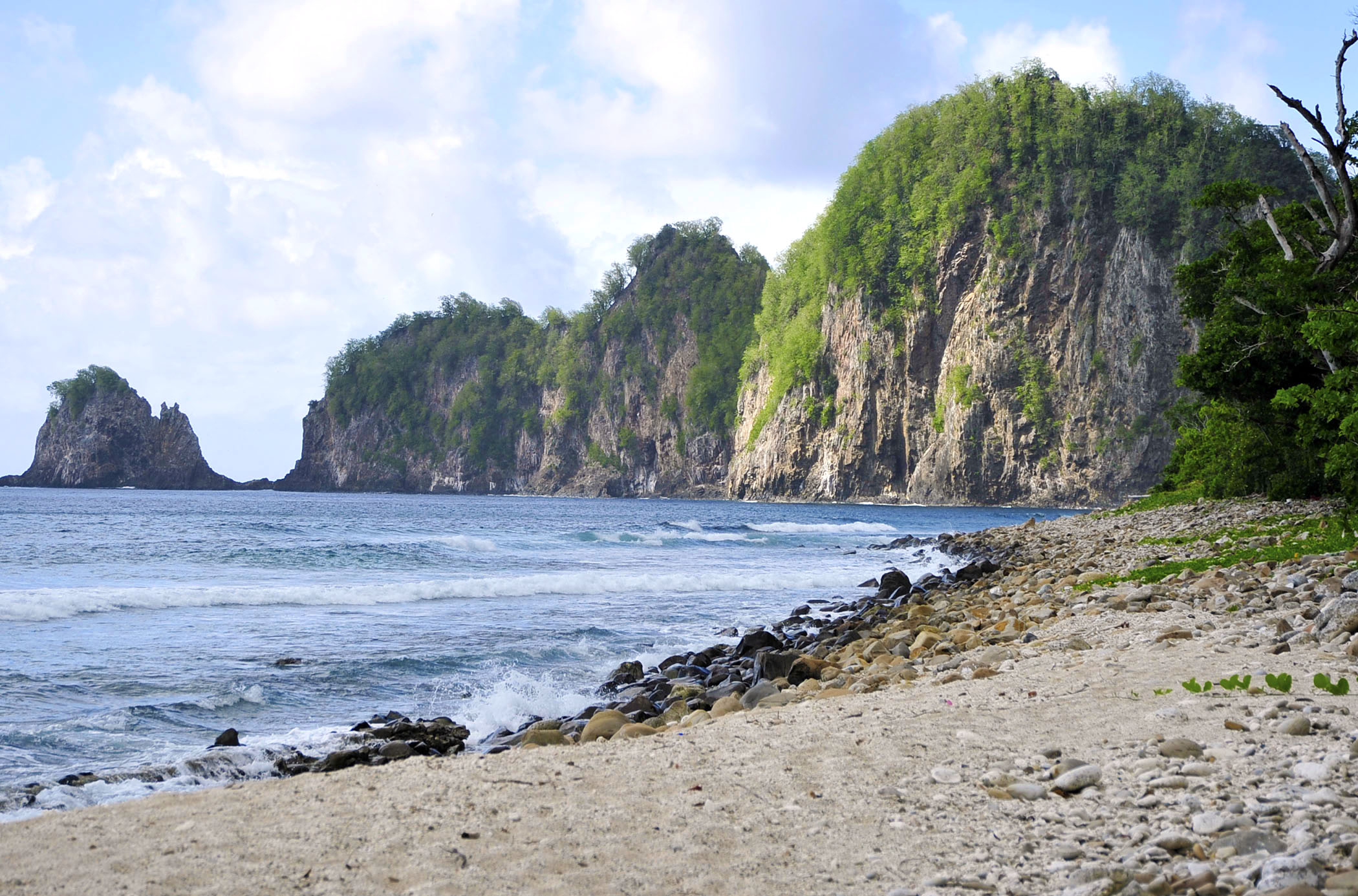
View of Vaiʻava Strait from the Tuafanua Trail.

- Ma’a-o-Tu’ulaumea, legendary landmark
- National Park of American Samoa
  - Mount 'Alava Adventure Trail
  - Tuafanua Trail
- Old Vatia, prehistoric village site listed on the U.S. National Register of Historic Places
- Pola Island (Pola Tai), named one of the Seven Natural Wonders of American Samoa by the Pago Pages
- Congregational Christian Church in American Samoa (CCCAS)
- Vai'ava Strait, 250-acre National Natural Landmark
- Vatia Beach
- World War II remnants, several concrete bunkers from World War II are located near the coastline

== Notable people ==
- Tuiasosopo Mariota, founder of the American Samoa Fono.

== See also ==
- Old Vatia
- Vatia Village Marine Protected Area
