= List of highways in American Samoa =

- American Samoa Highway 001 highway marker

Highway names
- Territorial: AS###

System links
- Highways in American Samoa

There are three numbered territorial highways in the United States territory of American Samoa. These highways are often referred to as "ASXXX" (example: AS001 is American Samoa Highway 001). In addition to the three numbered routes, there are unnumbered highways on the islands of Ofu, Olosega, Tau, and Tutuila. All are maintained by the American Samoa Department of Public Works.

== American Samoa Highway 001 ==
American Samoa Highway 001
- Location: Poloa–Onenoa
- Length: 35.853 mi (57.700 km)

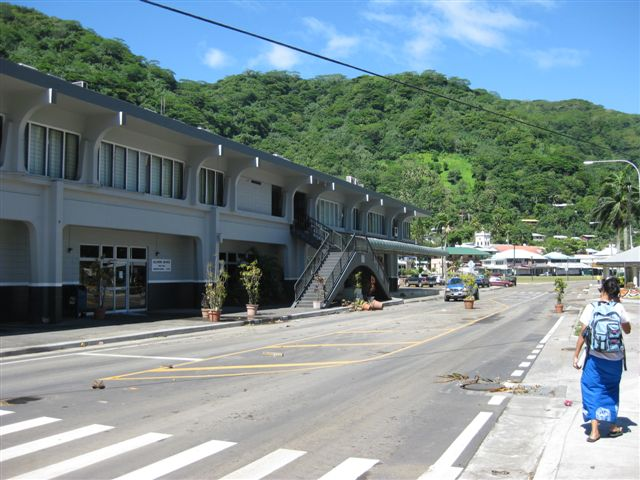
AS001 in front of the post office after a tsunami in 2008

American Samoa Highway 001 (AS001) is an east–west territorial highway on the island of Tutuila. It rubs the south shore of the island, from Poloa through Pago Pago to Onenoa. AS001 intersects the other two highways on the island, AS005 in Pago Pago and AS006 in Aua.

It is 35.853 miles (57.7 km) long. In Poloa, it ends at a dead end. In Onenoa, it ends at another dead end. It is the only road in Onenoa. It is also the only road in Poloa.

== American Samoa Highway 005 ==
American Samoa Highway 005
- Location: Fagasa – Pago Pago

American Samoa Highway 005 (AS005) is an east–west territorial highway on the island of Tutuila. It provides access from Pago Pago to Fagasa. It is about five miles (8.0 km) long. In Pago Pago, it ends at AS001. In Fagasa, it ends at Fagasa's Main Street.

== American Samoa Highway 006 ==
American Samoa Highway 006
- Location: Aua–Vatia

American Samoa Highway 006 (AS006) is a north–south territorial highway on the island of Tutuila. It provides access from Aua, east of Pago Pago, to Vatia.

== Ofu-Olosega Highway ==
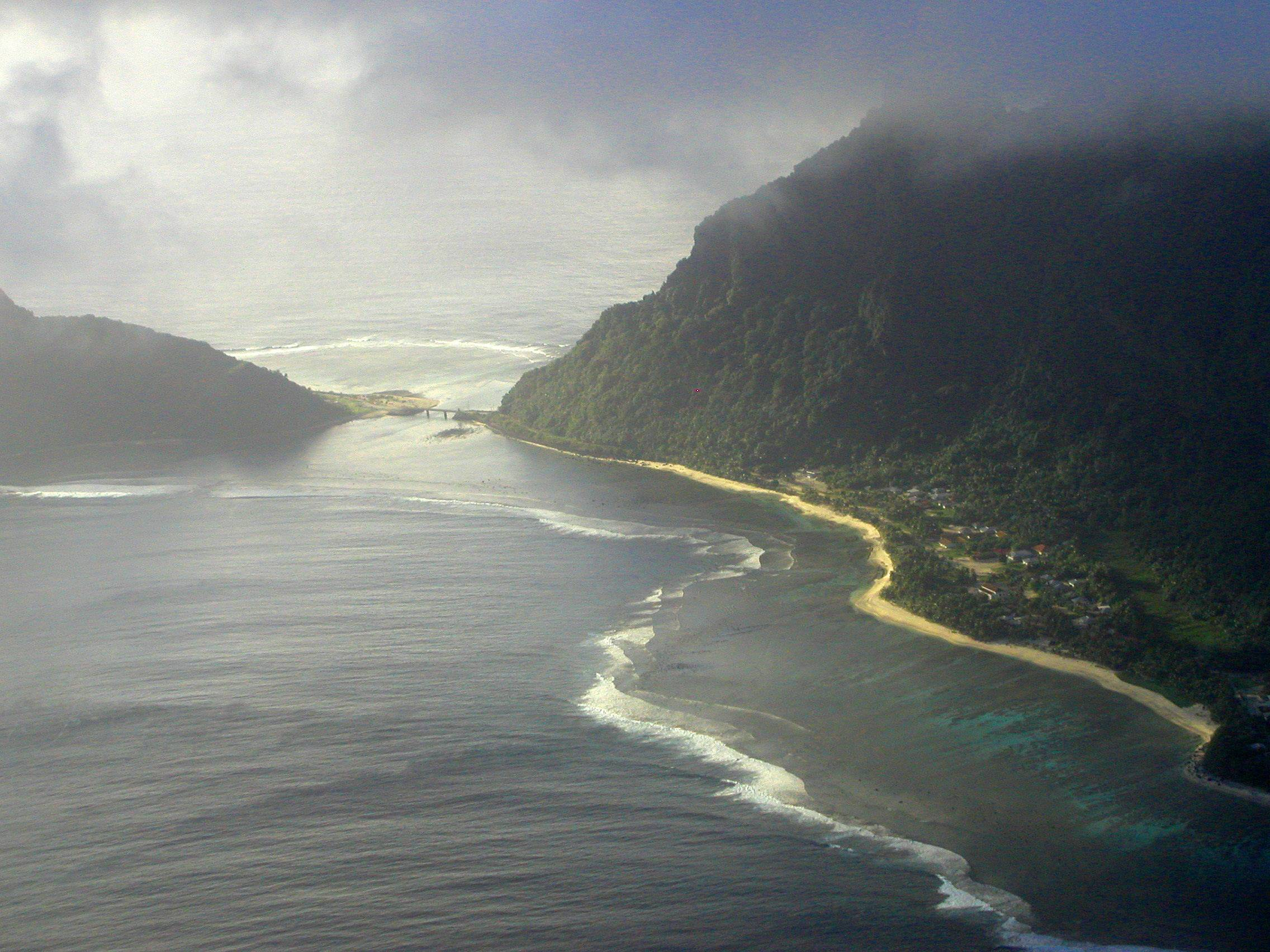
Ofu and Olosega Islands, with the Ofu-Olosega Highway Bridge connecting them

The Ofu-Olosega Highway is a highway linking the islands of Ofu and Olosega. The highway travels from the village of Ofu, along the coast of the islands of Ofu and Olosega to the village of Olosega. The highway passes the Ofu Airport, makes up most of the northern border of the Ofu portion of American Samoa National Park, and passes as a one-lane bridge over the Agasa Strait.
