= Rainmaker Mountain =

Mountain in American Samoa

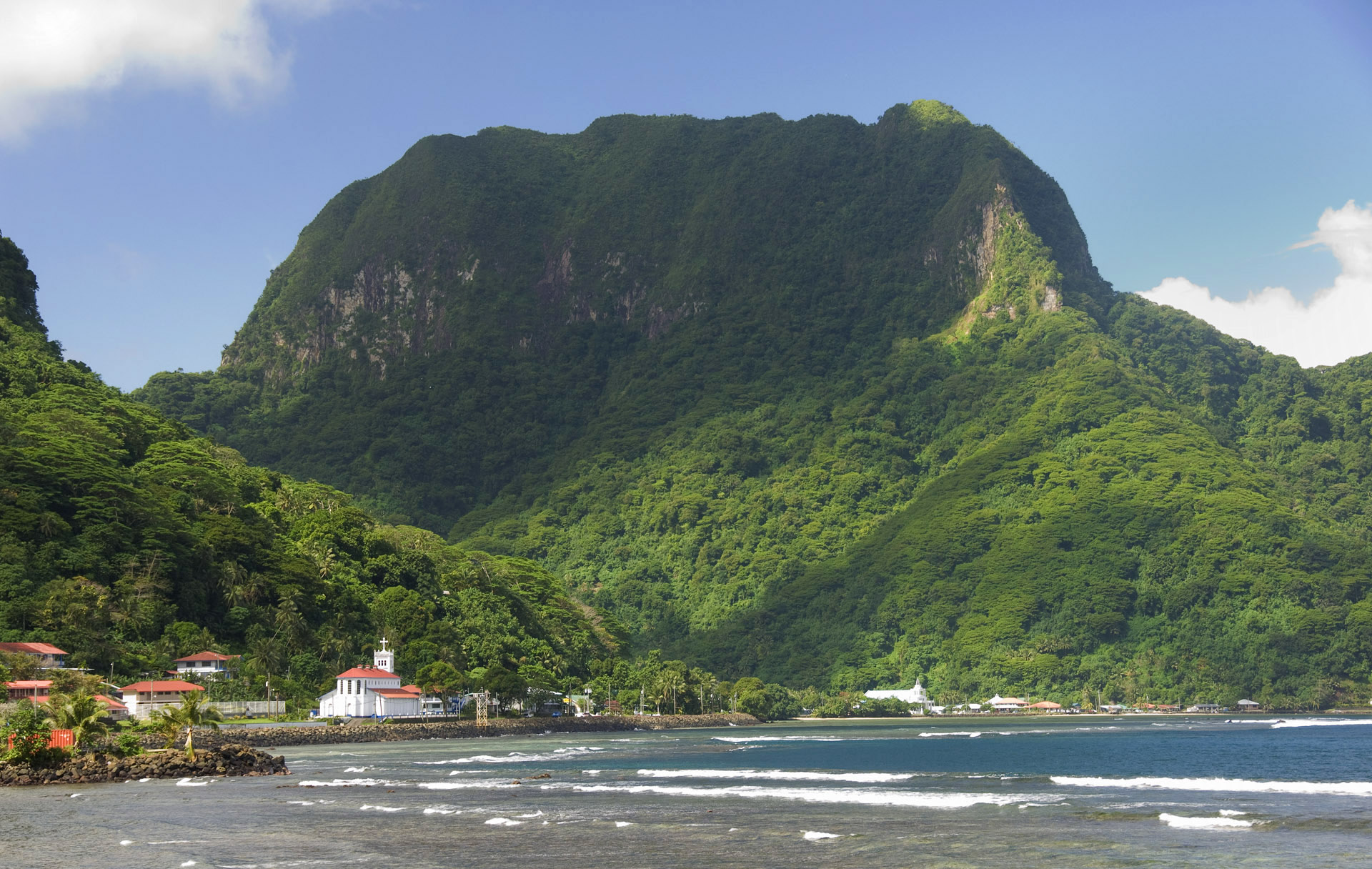
- Rainmaker Mountain in 2010

Highest point
- Elevation: 523 m (1,716 ft)
- Coordinates: 14°16′35″S 170°39′10″W

Geography
- Location: Tutuila Island in American Samoa

U.S. National Natural Landmark
- Designated: 1972

Rainmaker Mountain (also known as Mount Pioa and Mount Peiva) is the name of a mountain located near Pago Pago, American Samoa on Tutuila Island. Rainmaker Mountain traps rain clouds and gives Pago Pago the highest annual rainfall of any harbor. The average annual rainfall on the mountain is around 200 inches (510 cm). It has a three-pronged summit. Rainmaker Mountain and its base were designated a National Natural Landmark in 1972 due to the slopes’ tropical vegetation.

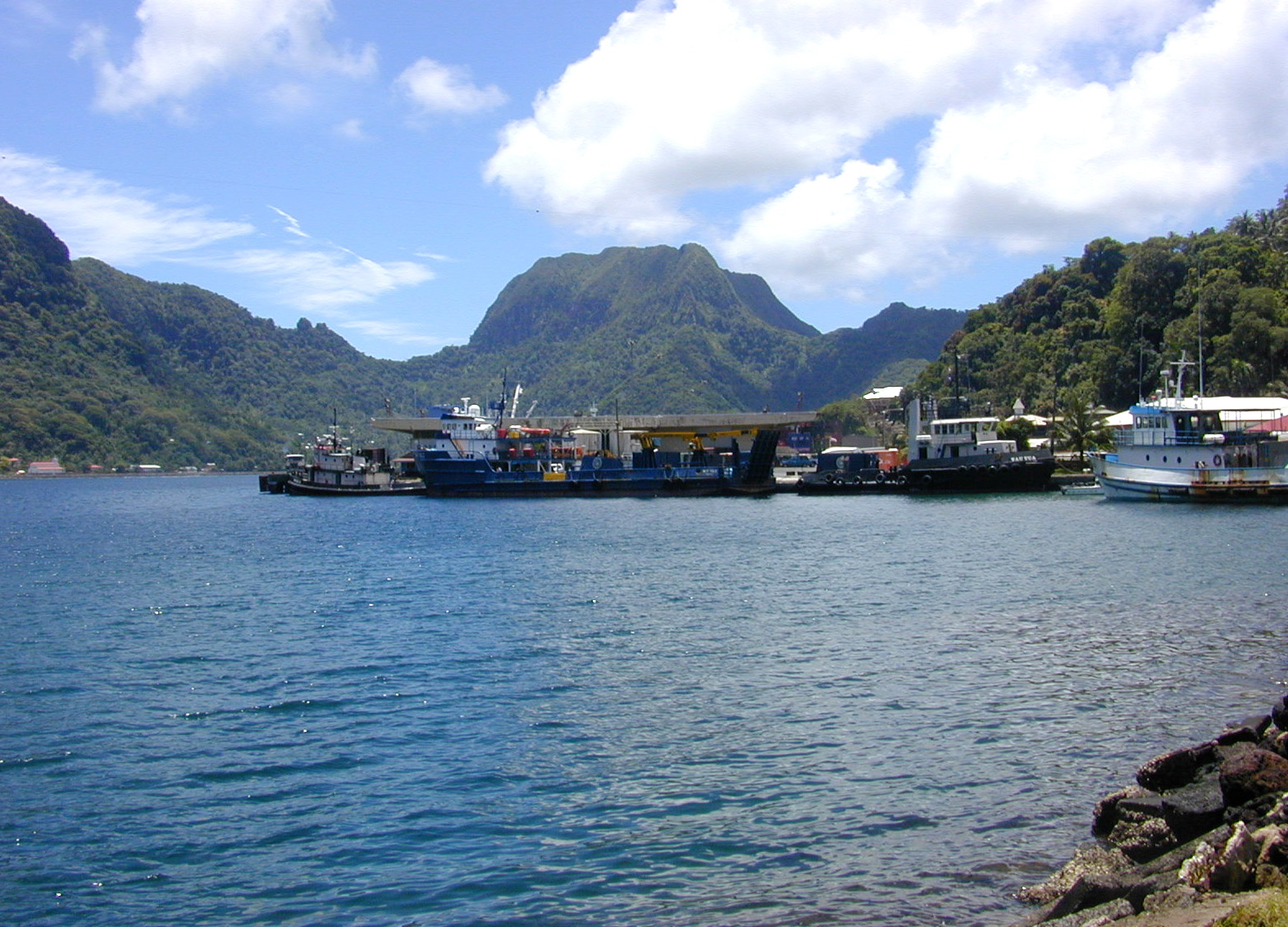
Rainmaker Mountain from Pago Pago Harbor

Rainmaker Mountain is one of several giant volcanic mountains that created Tutuila Island. It dominates the scene from nearly every point in Pago Pago Harbor. It comprises three mountain peaks: North Pioa, South Pioa, and Sinapioa. The peaks range in elevation from 1,619 feet (493 m) to 1,718 feet (524 m). The 170-acre (69 ha) designated landmark area occurs above the 800-acre (320 ha) contour line. Several endemic species are present only here and on Matafao Peak, the highest point on Tutuila.

Rainmaker Mountain, famous in Samoan legend and lore, is also geologically important as an example of a volcanic plug (quartz trachyte). The upper slopes are montane rainforest and the crest is montane scrub. It is a volcanic feature known as a trachyte plug, a volcanic intrusion made of extrusive igneous rocks having alkali feldspar and minor mafic minerals as the main components and a fine-grained, generally porphyritic texture.

A closeup of the mountain is visible up Rainmaker Pass. It is located behind the village of Lauli’i on the east side of Pago Pago Bay.

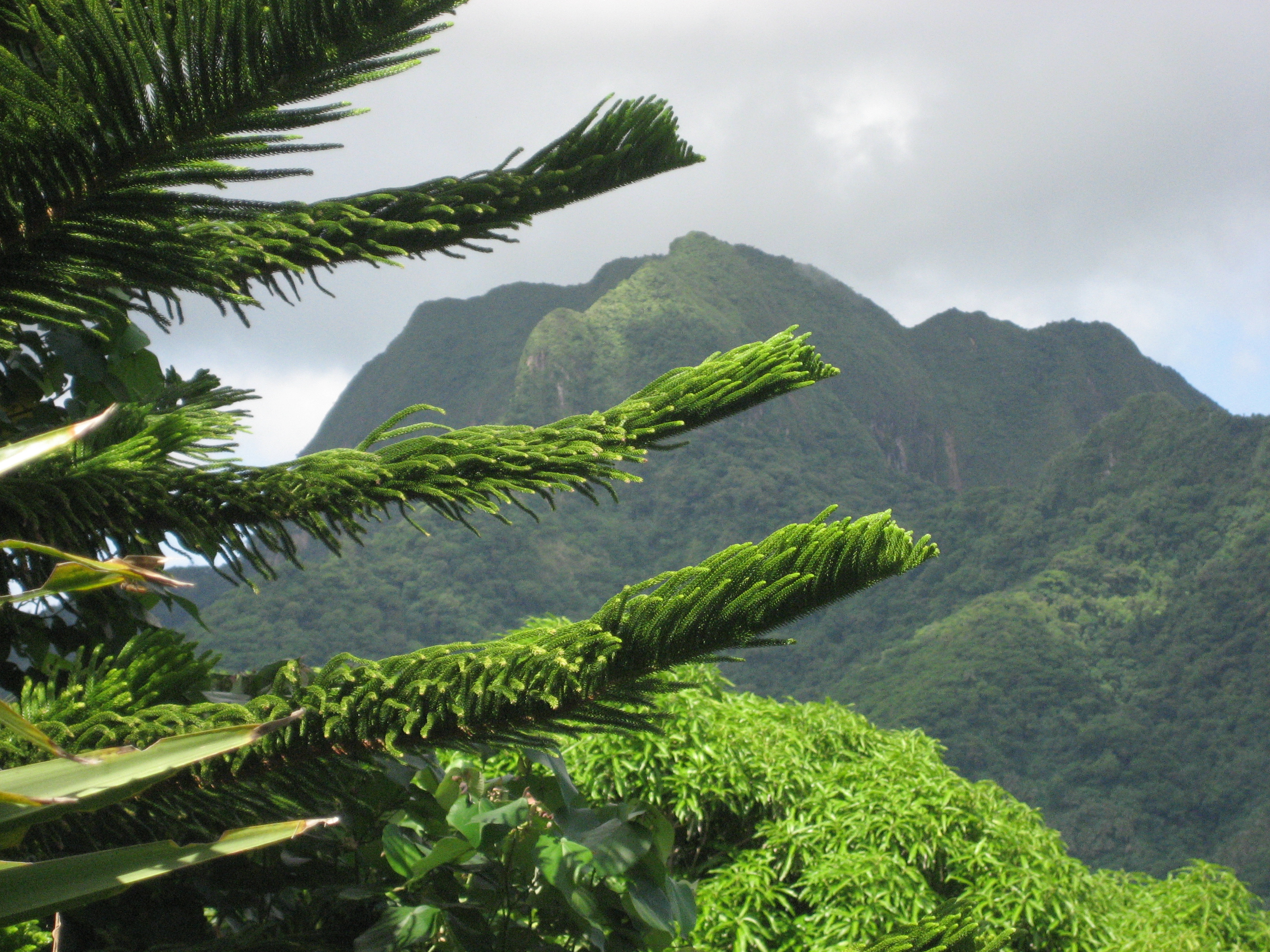
Rainmaker Mountain from the former Rainmaker Hotel

Rainmaker Hotel was a hotel at the port entrance under the mountain.

== Geology ==
Rainmaker Mountain is a prominent trachyte dome located near Lauliʻi. It is a quartz trachyte dome measuring approximately 300 meters in width, 720 meters in length, and reaching a height of 515 meters. Its unique structure is a testament to the volcanic history of the Pago Pago area. The mountain is characterized by its composition, which includes rhyolite that is low in quartz, as well as zones in contact with basaltic flows. The dome is primarily formed from basaltic fragments and explosion breccias, with occasional inclusions of trachyte or rhyolite blocks. It is classified as an endogenous dome, which formed through the upward push of magma into a narrow vent roughly 1.25 miles (2 kilometers) in diameter.

The volcanic processes that shaped Rainmaker Mountain were intense. The dome rose rapidly, spewing red, white, and black pumice along with biotite-rich cinders. This explosive activity, combined with outbursts of older basaltic materials, created a distinctive montane landscape. The summit features a cratered pumice cone, which formed when pasty lava erupted and partially filled the area. Columnar jointing is a noticeable feature, forming at right angles during the cooling phase of the lava. Rainmaker Mountain's formation is closely tied to the evolutionary stages of the Pago Volcano. The tuffs and breccias seen in other parts of the Pago Pago Harbor suggest that similar processes created other trachyte plugs in the region.

== Flora ==
Rainmaker Mountain is home to rare plant species that have been documented only once or twice within the Samoan Islands. These include Zschaemum cf. byrone, a grass species, and Mapania vitiensis, a sedge, both of which were found in the montane scrub habitat of the mountain. Additionally, the fern Dipteris, characterized by leaves that resemble those of Tacca, is another rare species recorded in the region. In the Samoan Islands, Dipteris has been observed exclusively on Rainmaker Mountain and Matafoa Mountain, highlighting the ecological significance of these National Natural Landmarks.

== Fauna ==
Petrels and shearwaters are known to breed predominantly on the higher elevations of Tutuila, with Rainmaker Mountain serving as a particularly significant habitat. These seabirds are rarely observed near the coastline. Rainmaker Mountain is a nesting site for both the Wedge-tailed Shearwater and the White-throated Storm Petrel. The Wedge-tailed Shearwater, a rare species in American Samoa, likely burrows in the mountain's high-altitude soil. It is also thought to inhabit the cliffs and inaccessible montane scrub of the mountain.

In 2023, a groundbreaking discovery was reported: researchers from Archipelago Research and Conservation (ARC), in collaboration with USFWS, DMWR, and NPS, identified four active burrows of the rare Tahiti Petrel on Rainmaker Mountain and Matafao Mountain. This marked the first confirmed breeding activity of the species on Tutuila in nearly 40 years. Additionally, researchers documented new colonies of the Tropical Shearwater.

== See also ==
- List of National Natural Landmarks in American Samoa
