= Tualatai County =

County in American Samoa, United States

Coordinates: 14°21′05″S 170°46′55″W

Tuālātai County, American Sāmoa
- County
- Tuālātai County
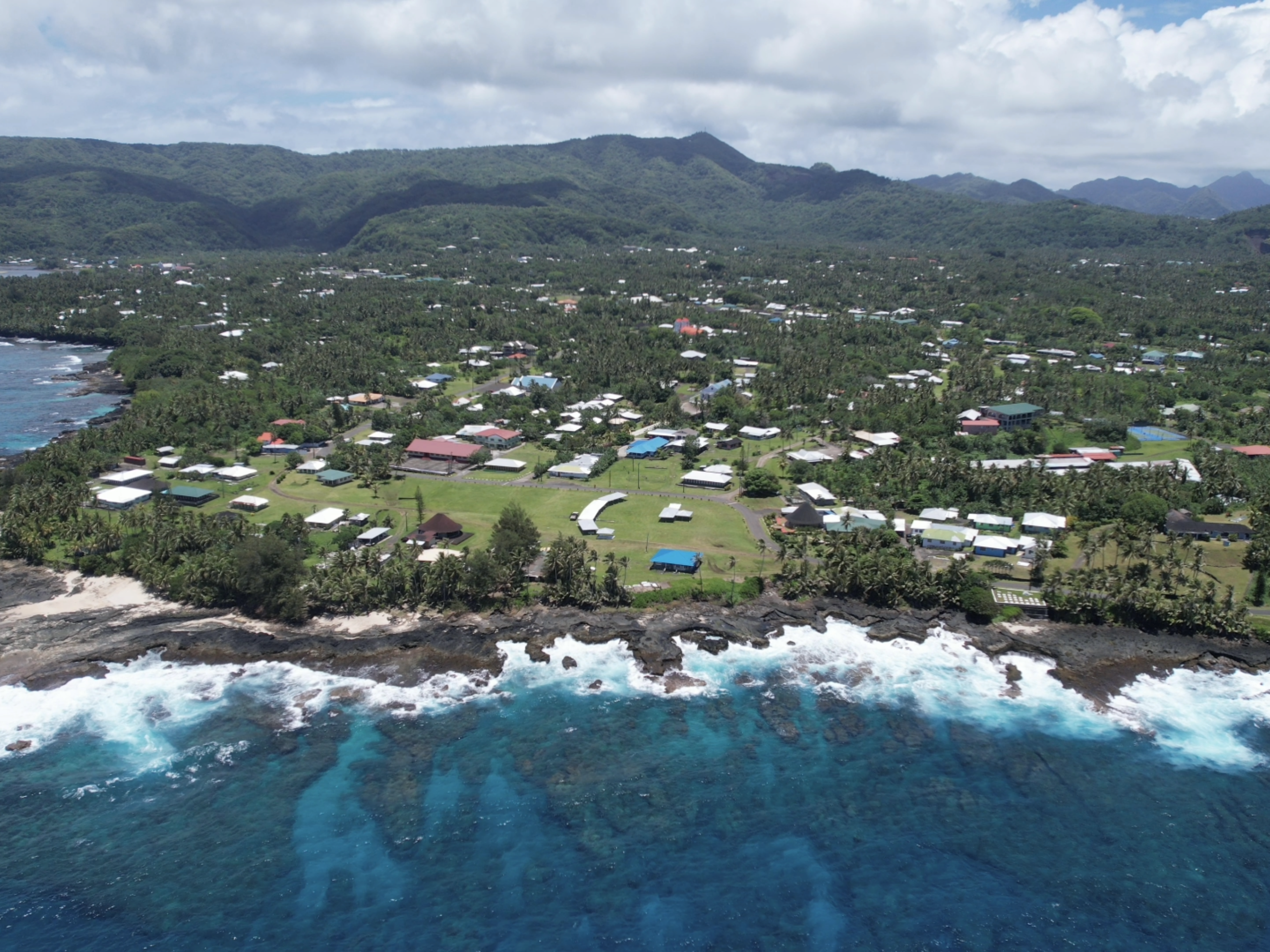
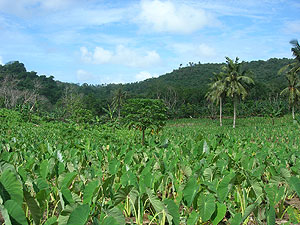
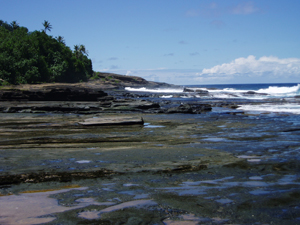
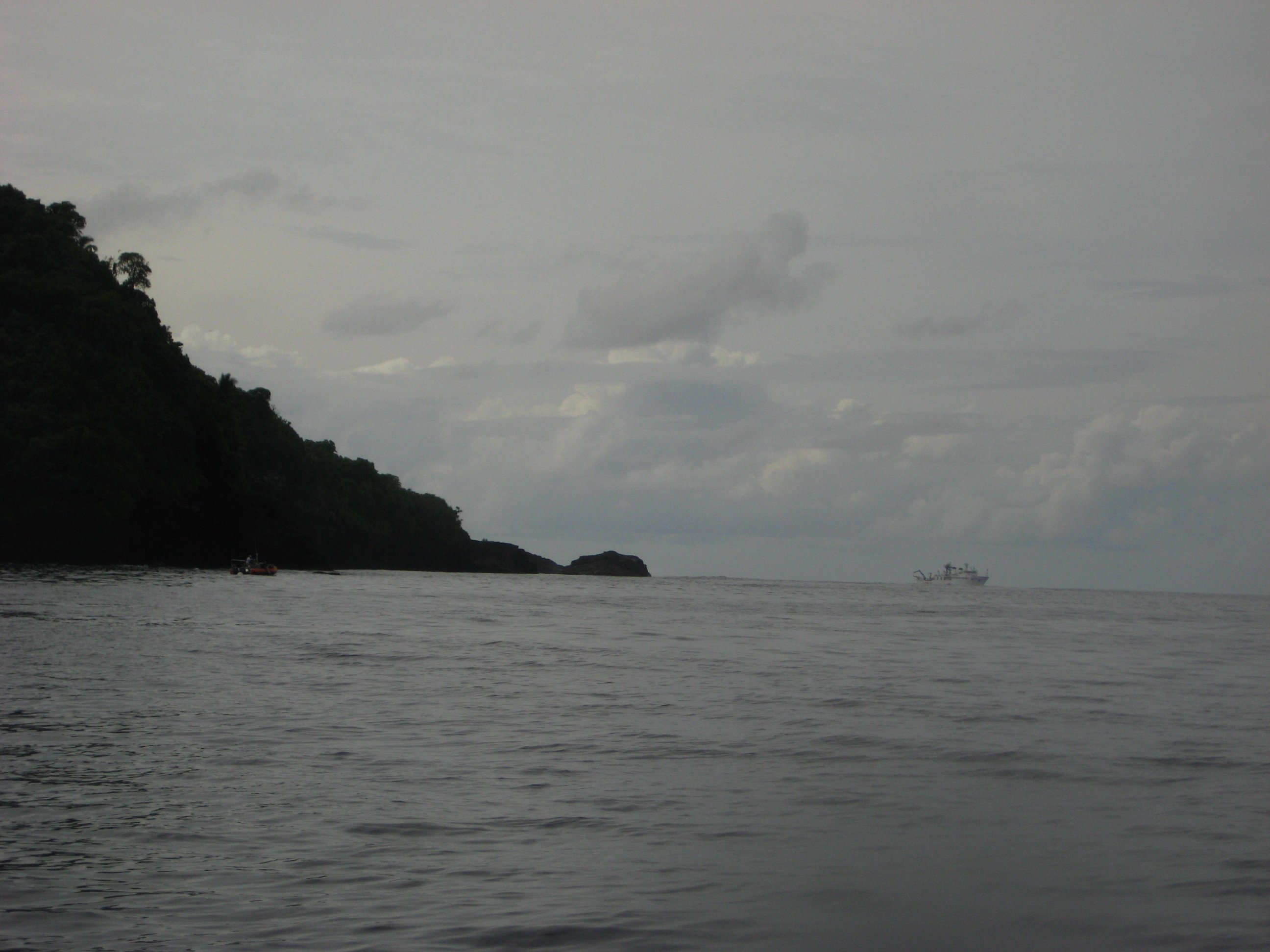
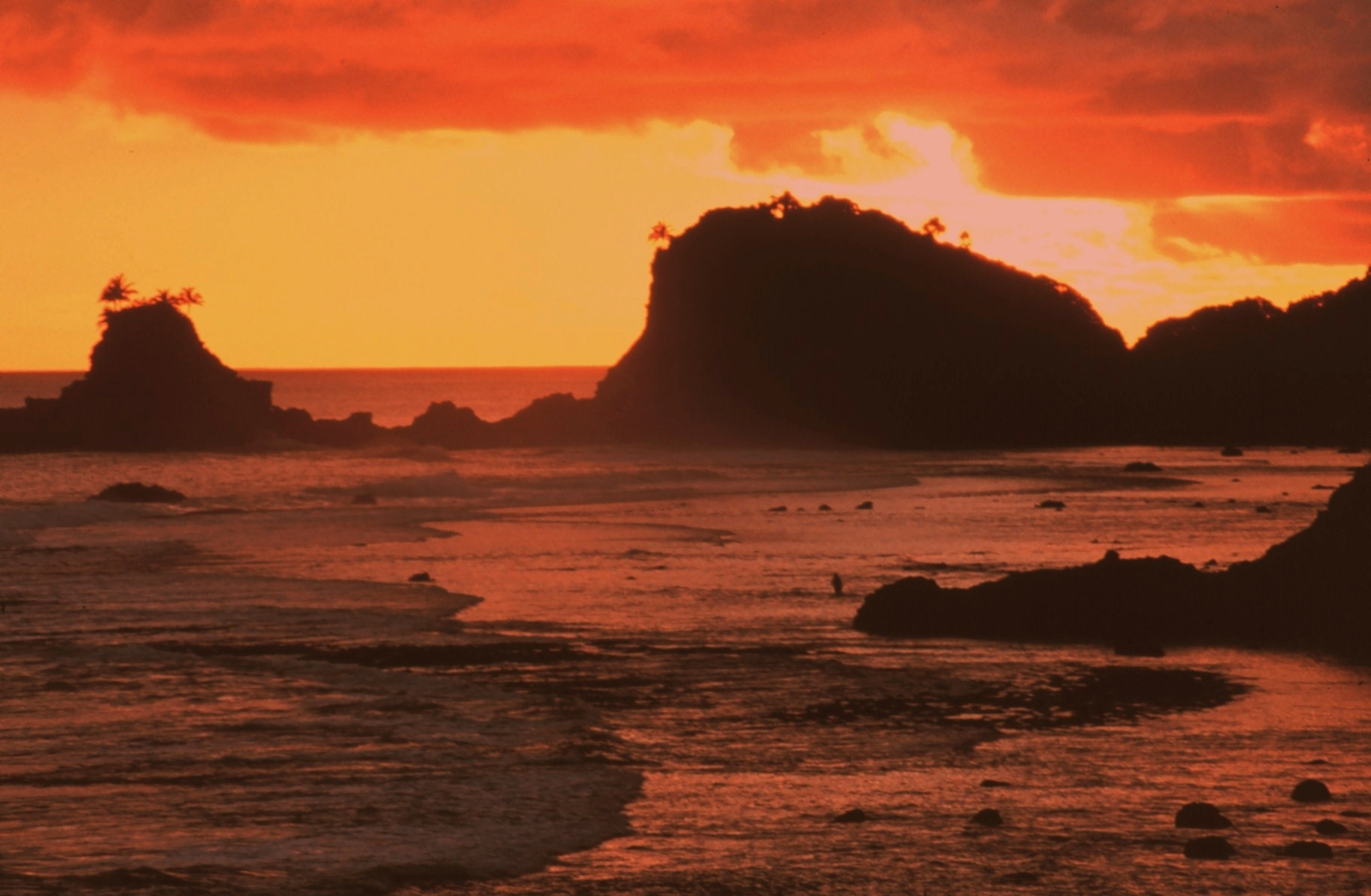
- Vailoatai Fogamaʻa Crater National Natural Landmark Leʻala Shoreline National Natural Landmark Steps Point Fagatele Bay

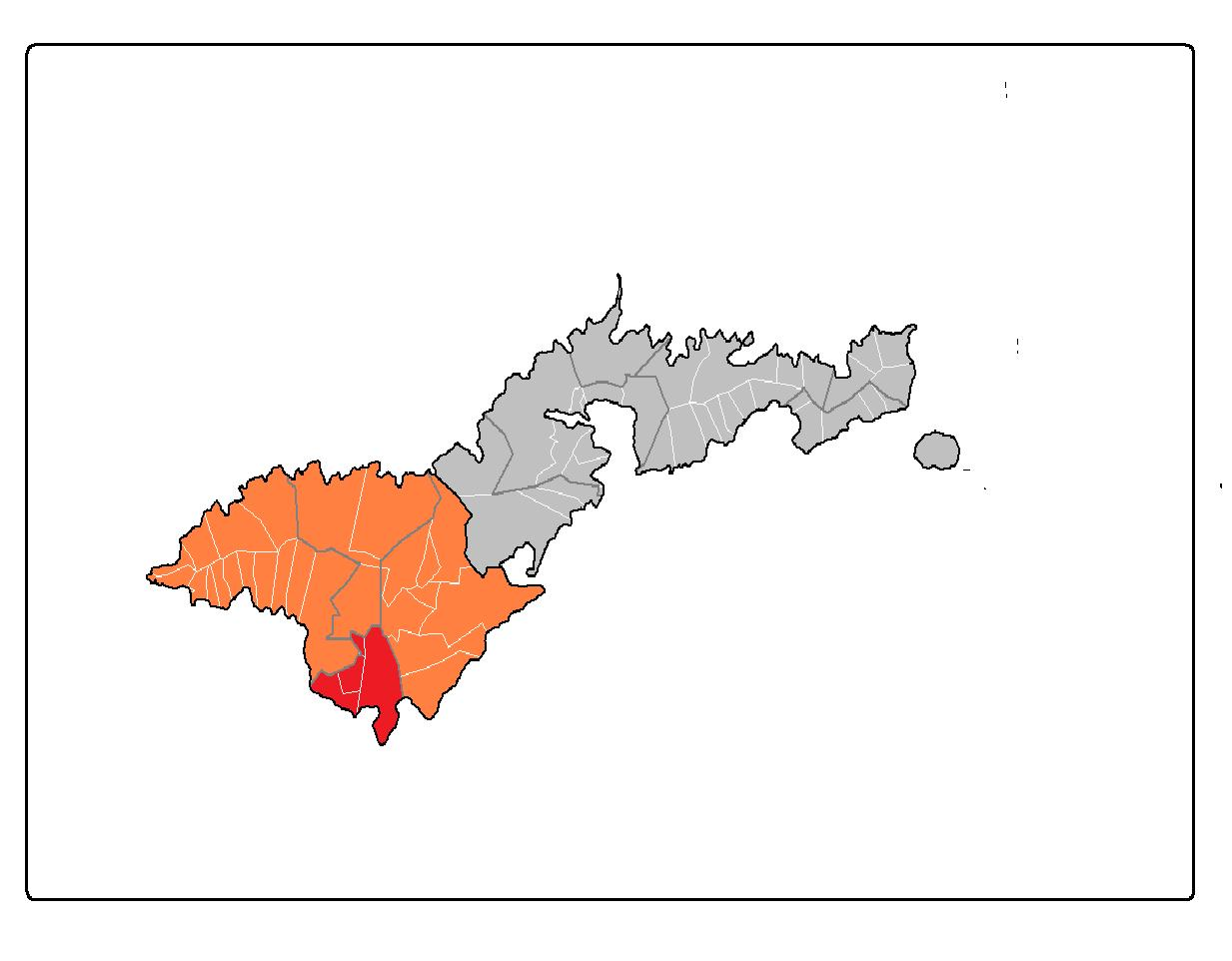
- Map of Tutuila where Tuālātai County is highlighted in red, while the Western District is marked in orange.
- Country: United States
- Territory: American Samoa
- Island: Tutuila
- District: Western
- Named for: Tuālā
- Largest town: Vailoatai
- County seat: Vailoatai

Area
  - Total: 6.71 sq mi (17.4 km^{2})

Population (2020)
  - Total: 3,010
  - Density: 449/sq mi (173/km^{2})
- Time zone: UTC−11 (Pacific Time Zone)
- ZIP code: 96799
- Area code: +1 684

Tuālā-tai County is one of the five counties that make up the Western District (le Falelima i Sisifo) of American Samoa.

The other four are Ālātaua, Fofō, Leāsina (Aitūlagi) and Tuālā-uta (Ma’upū).

The villages of Fūtiga, Itū'au (Malaeloa), Taputimu and Vailoatai form Le Itūmālō o Tuālātai (the county/district of Tualatai). Part of the Puapua area starting from the junction of Taputimu Road and Route 001 to Futiga are lands that belong to Tuālā-tai families and are part of the county.

Vailoatai serves as the county’s principality as the titular head of the district (fa'asuaga) is located here.

The county is represented by one senator in the American Samoa Senate and by one representative in the American Samoa House of Representatives.

It is the fourth most populous county of American Samoa as of 2020.

== Etymology ==
Tuālātai / Tuālā-tai

Tuālā, v. to put a canoe more before the wind; n. the back of a sail.

Tuālā, who lived approximately in the 16th century, was the eldest son of Tui Ā'ana Tama-a-le-lagi and half-brother of Queen Salamāsina. He was the founder of the 'āiga sā Tuālā.

The ‘tai’ suffix designates this county as being the Tuālā county on the side towards the sea, whereas Tuālā-uta is the Tuālā county on the side towards the land or inland.

The name of the county, Tuālātai, is derived from the Samoan language and translates into English as “Tuālā by the Sea".

== Pre-1900 History ==
During Samoa's pre-1900 history, Tuālā-tai and Tuālā-uta formed an usoga (alliance) that represented the larger Aitūlagi community in times of war. Tuālā-tai was assigned as the itū’au (controller of troops) whereas Tuālā-uta was designated as the alātaua (director of wars).

On the battlefield, Faleniu of Tuālā-uta had the honor of serving as the muā'au (the vanguard or the advance army) while the itū’au formed the center or as the main army.

The assumption of these war-time roles by allied villages or districts was a common practice throughout pre-contact Samoa with its roots in the first Mālietoa government. The last intra-island conflict in which these two counties went together into battle took place in 1892.

In the high titles of ceremony, the salutation, Fofō ma Aitūlagi, stands for the entire Western District of Tutuila (le fa'alupega o le Falelima i Sisifo).

Fofō is home to Leone and all of the Ālātaua villages west of it.

Aitūlagi is the name of the famed family of high orator chiefs (tama matua) from the Malaeloa town of the same name within Leāsina county.

When Leāsina, Tuālā-tai and Tuālā-uta counties are placed as Aitūlagi opposite of Fofō, they are then called Ma'upū by way of contrast.

== Fa'alupega: Ceremonial Greetings of Tuālātai ==
Afio Sātele ma alo o Fānene

Susū le matua ma le falefia o ali'i

Maliu mai tauto'oto'o

Mamalu o Faleālili ma le Faletolu ma le fetalaiga a Itū'au

== Fa'asuaga from 1900 to Present ==
Sātele Itulā, brother of Satele Uga (the previous titleholder who held the office jointly with Satele Pili prior to 1900). Satele Itula was one of the signatories to the 1900 Tutuila Deed of Cession. When Manu’a suffered severe damage from a hurricane in 1915, Satele led efforts to relocate more than half of that district’s population to Tutuila while relief efforts took place there. In 1920, he and Mauga Moimoi were two of the early leaders of the Mau Movement in American Samoa. Governor Terhune terminated them both from their District Governor posts due to doubts of their loyalty to his administration. They were later reinstated. Satele had pushed for the establishment of a civilian government versus a naval governor. Died in 1926.

Sātele Mosooi, son of Satele Uga. Succeeded to the title in 1926.

Sātele Teutusi, son of Satele Uga, half-brother to Satele Mosooi. Succeeded to the title in 1937.

Sātele Faumuinā Solomona, son of Satele Pili. Succeeded to the title in 1948, after resigning from the Faumuina title of Sa’ole. He was the only person in the history of the territory to have held two paramount chief titles. As Satele, he became the second and last chairman of the Atoa o Ali’i (1951–52), after Le’iato Tunu. The upper house was later replaced by the Senate in the Third Legislature.

Sātele Mosegi (1925–1976), son of Satele Teutusi. Succeeded to the title in 1958. He was one of the Tualatai delegates to the 1960 and 1966 Am. Samoa Constitutional Conventions. In 1966, he presided over the Western District meeting that split the traditional Lealataua County into today’s Fofo and Alataua districts. He served in various government posts to include the Dept. of Public Works, Office of Attorney General and the Police Force as well as Senator and District Governor.

Sātele Fili Liufau, descendant of Satele Talafalemalama. Succeeded to the title in 1980. This Satele was shot and killed by Viliamu Satele (descendant of Satele Teutusi), along with Tuiloma Saevii Satele Tupea at a guesthouse in Vailoatai. Died in 1981.

Sātele Uoka Momosea (1912–1995), descendant of Satele Pili. Succeeded to the title in 1985. Served as Senator, Tualatai County, 1989–96. Died while in office.

Sātele Galu Teutusi (1942–2022), son of Satele Teutusi. Succeeded to the title in 2008. Served as Western District Governor (2008-2012), Secretary of Samoan Affairs (2013-2015), Senator, Tualatai County(2017-2022). Served as the Vice Chair for the 2010 Am. Samoa Constitutional Convention. Died while in office.

== Legends ==
In the book, Ole Manuō o Tala Tu’u ma Fisaga o Tala Ave, the village of Vailoa defeated the cannibal king Tuife’ai with the assistance of two brothers from Ātua, High Chiefs Lutu and Solosolo.

Tuāulu, the original name of the Vailoatai village, was specifically set aside to prepare human sacrifices for Tuife'ai during his reign.

Tuife'ai is a title that has many tala (legends) from Manu'a, Tutuila and 'Upolu. Sunia notes that the title goes back as far as 500 A.D., and that the Tuife'ai of that time is responsible for the first failed invasion of the Manu'a kingdom. The title established familial ties with the Mālietoa in the 13th or 14th century.

The Malaeloa Itū'au Olo Site (or defensive fortification), which was nominated for the National Register of Historic Places in 2015, is supported by Samoan cultural histories and oral traditions relating to interregional conflicts and defenses against cannibalism during pre-contact periods. It was built to protect villagers from Tuife'ai and his aumaga (army).

The other feared aitu (ghost, spirit) of the district is that of the legendary Tui Ātua from the village of Fūtiga whose victims – those who violate his taboos – can only be healed by HC Ulufaleilupe and HTC Uiagalelei.

== Historical Sites ==
Asotau is the name of the village malaefono in Taputimu and Vailoatai. It is a historical marker of the Tafa'ifā I’amafana’s failed invasion of Manu’a. The counties of Sua and Vāifanua rallied under PC Le’iato to expel I’amafana’s forces from Tuālātai, where the king sought refuge under the protection of his relative, PC Sātele, during his retreat from Manu’a.

After a battle ensued, the conflict was resolved peacefully via a traditional style intercession known as a seumālō. King I’amafana and his forces returned to 'Upolu, and the county took the words ‘aso tau’ (Day of War) as the name of its malae to commemorate the event.

== Landmarks ==
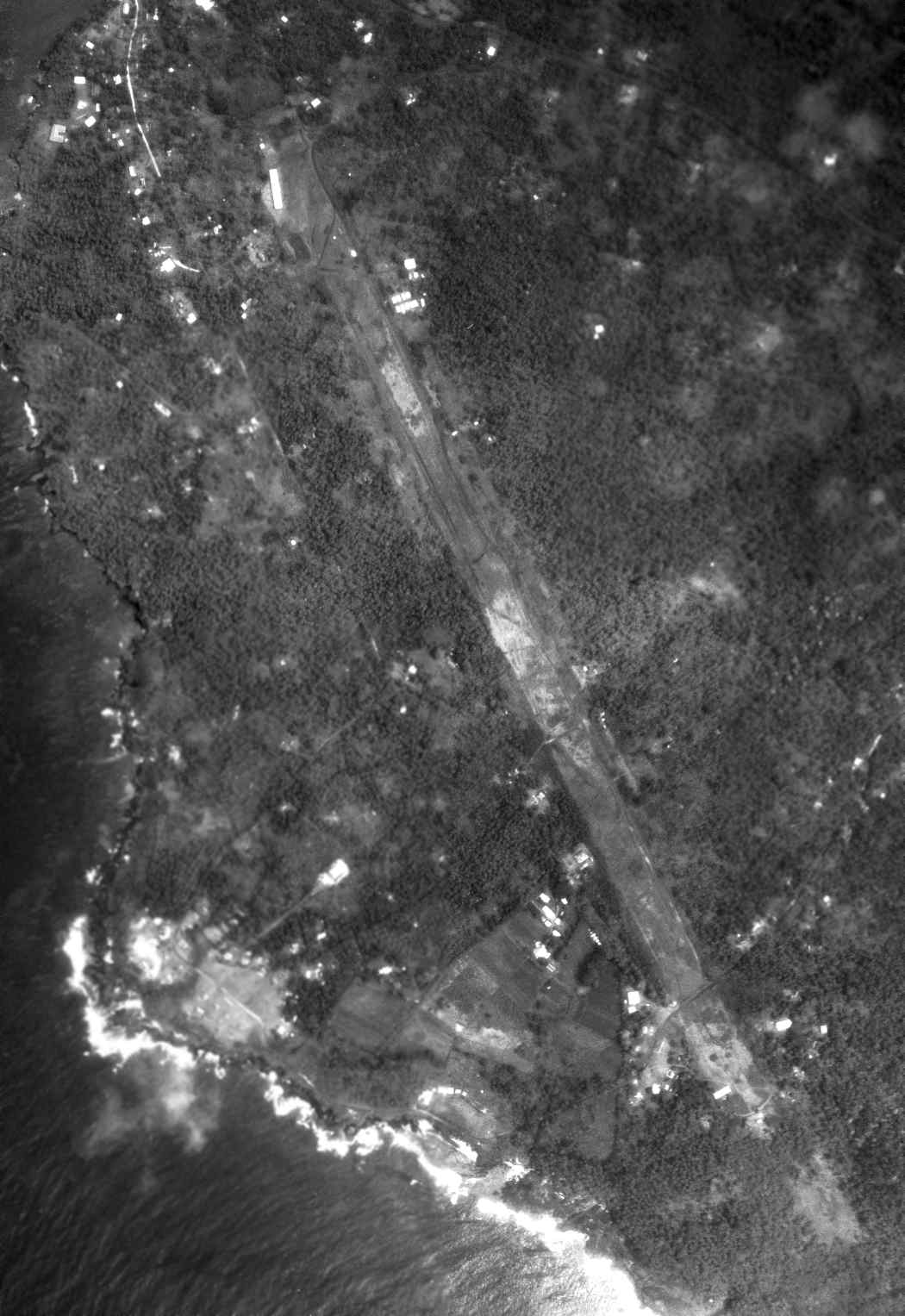
Leone Airfield, Taputimu, American Samoa

During World War II, U.S. Marines built an airstrip that spanned Leone, Vailoatai and Taputimu. Unfortunately, the airstrip could not be used due to prevailing winds, which made take-offs difficult. Only two planes were able to make use of the airstrip before it was abandoned. Government facilities and residential units have since been built over the old airstrip.

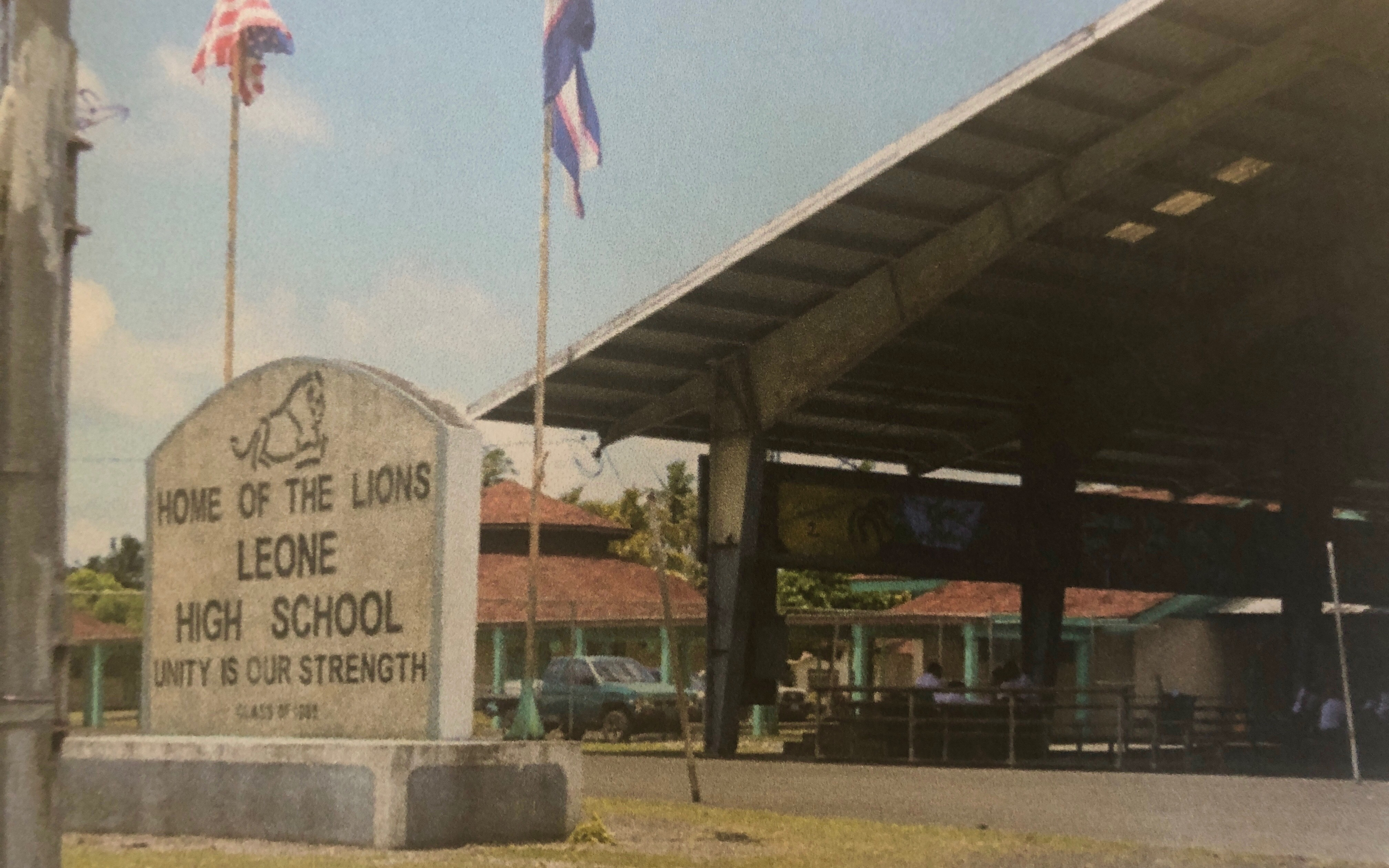
Leone High School

In 1965, the Leone High School was opened in Vailoatai and Leone. The school was designed for students from the Western District and transfer students from Manu'a.

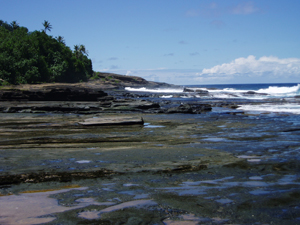
Leala Shoreline National Natural Landmark

In 1972, the Leʻala Shoreline in Taputimu and Vailoatai was designated as a National Natural Landmark by the National Park Service. Le'alā Shoreline is a young flow of basalt, inter-bedded with layers of tuff that illustrates erosion by wave action. The site is covered with dense tropical vegetation.

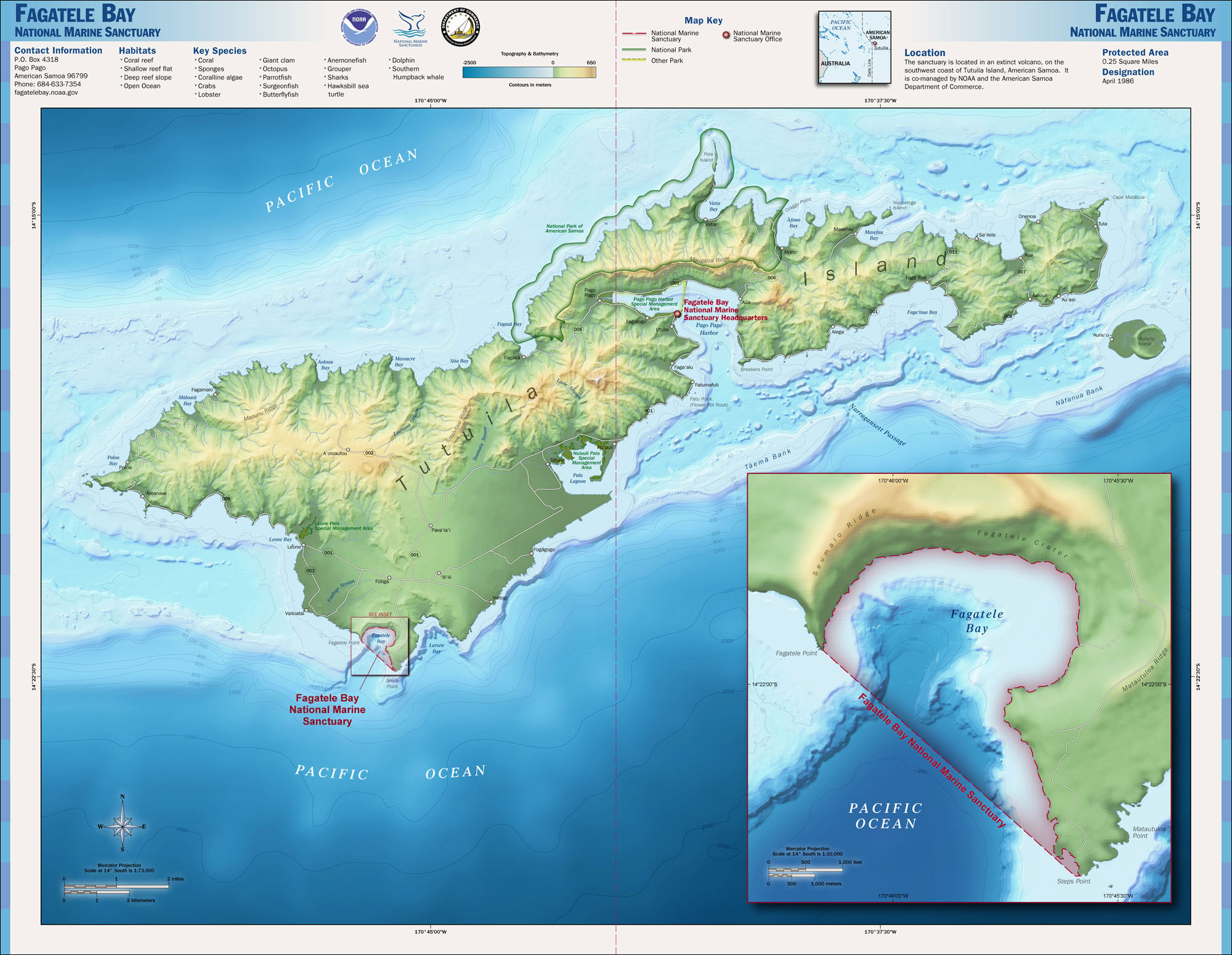
Fagatele Bay NMS map

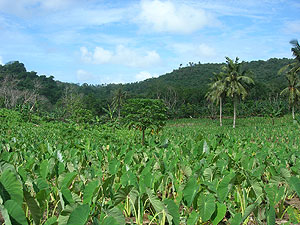
Fogamaʻa Crater

The Fogamaʻa Crater in Fūtiga and Vaitogi was also designated as a National Natural Landmark in 1972. Fogamaʻa Crater is one of very few illustrations of the most recent episode of volcanism in American Samoa.

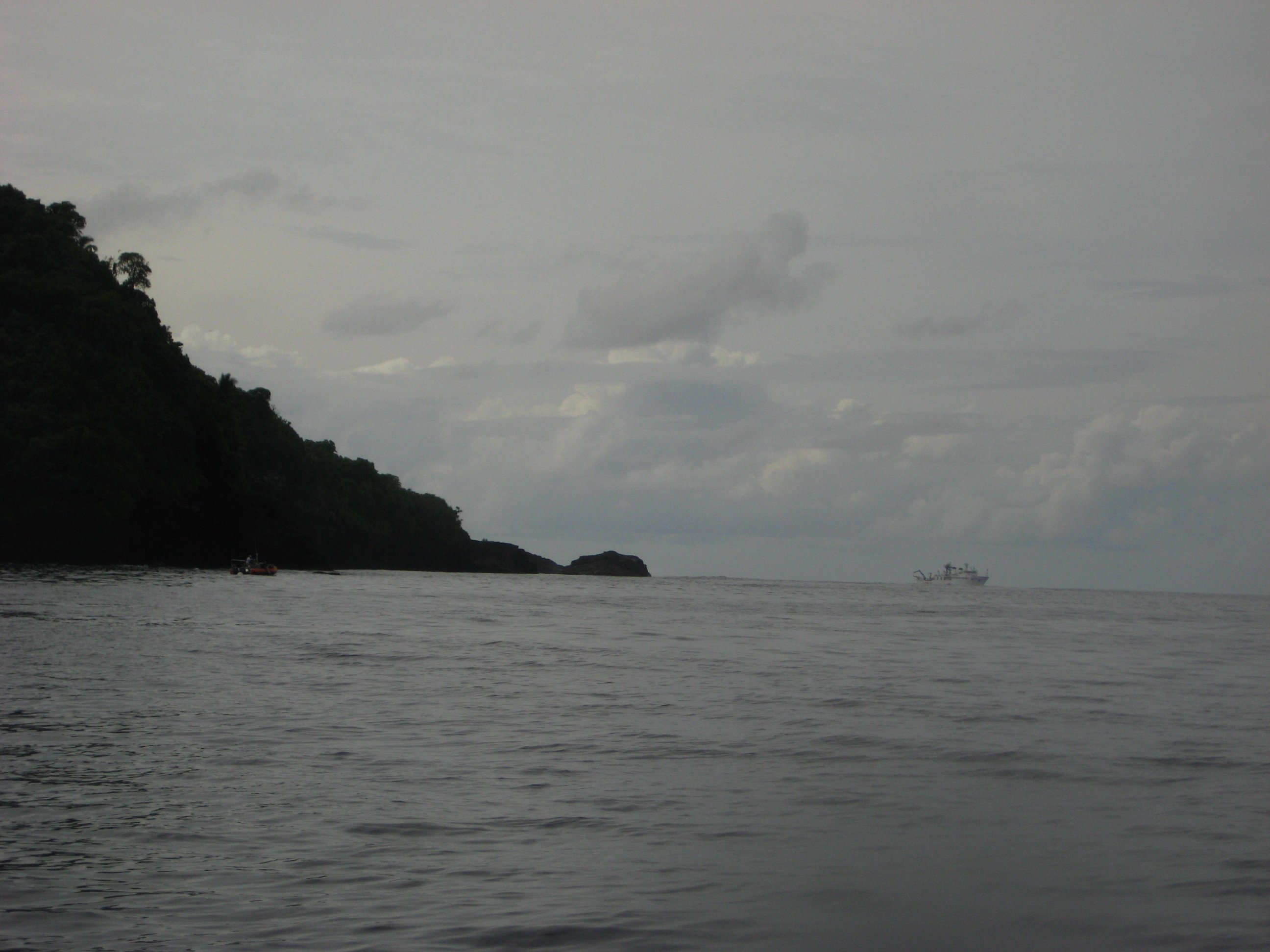
Steps Point

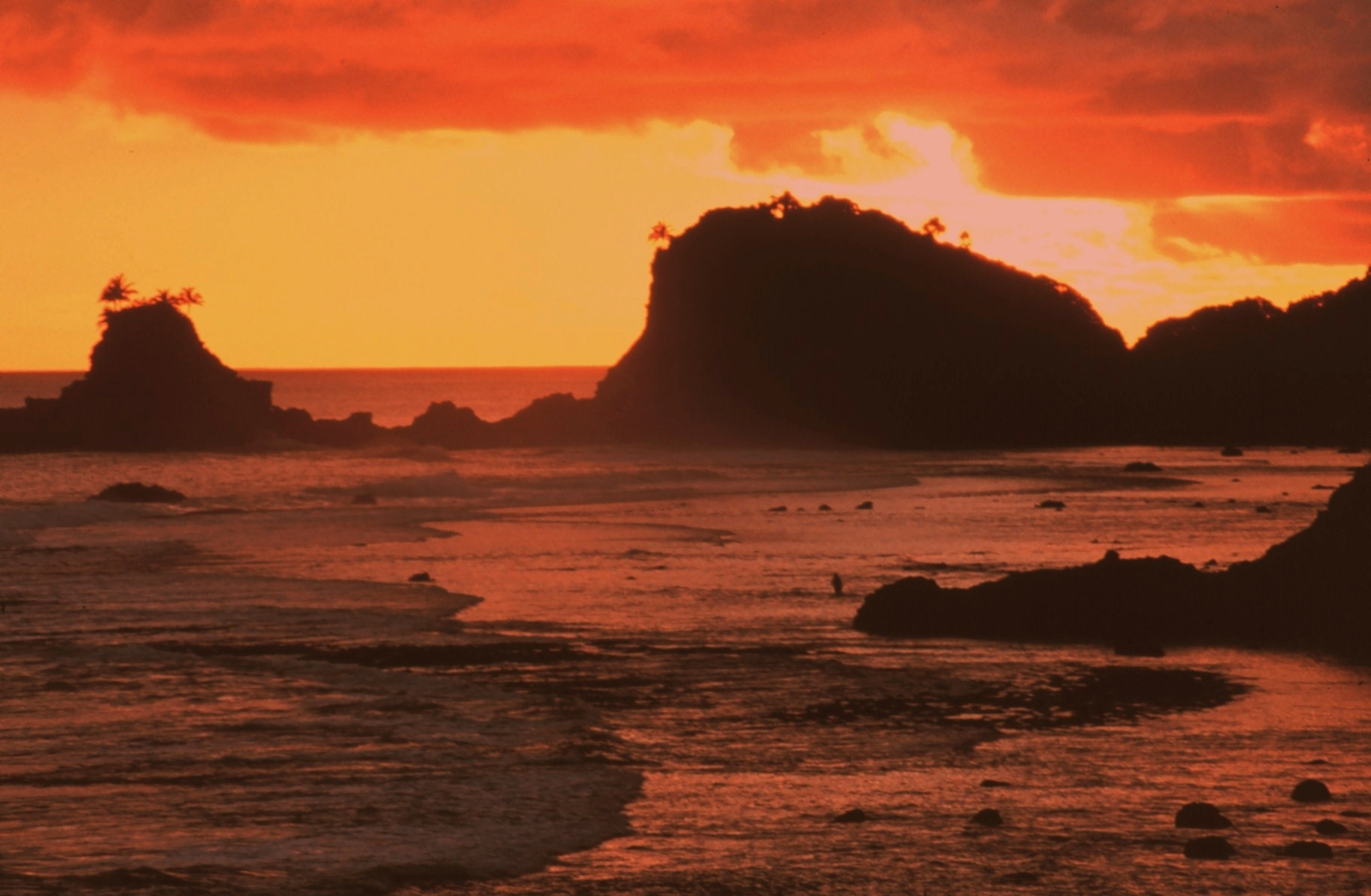
Fagatele Bay sunset

In 1986, Fagatele Bay National Marine Sanctuary in Fūtiga was designated by the National Marine Sanctuary Program.

The Seumālō Ridge rises over 120 meters (400 feet) high along the western and northern sides of Fagatele Bay, while the eastern side of the bay is bounded by Manautuloa Ridge at over 60 meters (200 feet) high.

In 2015, the Malaeloa Itū'au Olo Site was nominated for the National Register of Historic Places. It is located 2.4 kilometers (1.5 miles) north of the junction of Malaeloa Road and Route 001, and it consists of a raised earth platform, with three lower levels of terraces, and two lunate-shaped moundsand trenches.

In 2018, the only landfill site in American Samoa – located in Fūtiga – was reported to have only two years left before it reached its limit. The American Samoa Power Authority (ASPA) was unable to find another site in the territory and instead began recompacting the site in Futiga. By digging up the landfill and recompacting it, the landfill may be usable for up to fifteen years longer.

== Notable people ==
Afoa Sanerive (1914–1995). Member, HR – 1951–52, 1971–72; Senator – 1953–54, 1965–68, Tuālātai County. One of the Tuālā-tai delegates to the Am. Samoa 1960 Constitution Convention that addressed many important issues to include U.S. citizenship for the people of the territory.

Amituana'i, Apaau. Member, HR, Tuālātai County, 1959–60. Second woman to be elected to the legislature.

Amituana'i, Dr. N. R. Iosefa. Senator, Tuālātai County. Studied at medical schools in Guam and served at the Am. Samoa Hospital and LBJ Tropical Medical Center as an internist until his retirement in 1984.

Asi Aii (1914–1995). Member, HR, Tuālātai County, 1948–50.

Asuemu Ulufaleilupe Fuimaono (January 24, 1924 – September 9, 2008) was an American Samoan politician and Paramount Chief who served as American Samoa's first Delegate-at-Large to the United States House of Representatives from 1970 until 1974. Fuimaono also served as the governor of Western District, American Samoa on the island of Tutuila from his appointment in 1993 until his death in 2008.

Eni Fa'aua'ā Hunkin Faleomavaega Jr. (August 15, 1943 – February 22, 2017) was an American Samoan politician who served as the territory's lieutenant governor and congressional delegate.

Fagaoalii Sātele Sunia (c. 1946 – September 5, 2015) was an American Samoan literacy advocate and educator. She served as the First Lady of American Samoa from January 1997 to March 2003 during the tenure of her husband, former governor Tauese Sunia, who died in office in 2003.

Lutu, Etenauga ‘Ete’ Lam Yuen Afoa (Feb 22 1950 – October 12, 2023) Served as Nurse Educator, Nursing Office Supervisor, Associate Director of Nursing Services at the LBJ Hospital. Appointed as Director of Nursing Services in 1997.

Meleiseā Samuelu. Senator, Tuālātai County, 1985–88. He was a public safety officer before his election to the senate

Te'o Peaua (1910–1966). Senator, Tuālātai County, 1955–56.

Toilolo Fereti, Senator, Tuālātai County, 1995–98.

Tuatagaloa Pakete Manase (1896–1976). Member, HR, Tuālātai County, 1963–64.

Tulifua Tini Lam Yuen (c. 1952 – Jan. 4, 2021) was a long time business person who was selected in 2000 by the Tuālātai county as its senator, and served for three-consecutive, four-year terms. During those terms, he served as Senate President Pro Tempore, chair of the Senate Ways and Means Committee, vice chair of two standing committees and was an active member for other committees.

Uiagalelei Sinapati. (1902–1982) Member, HR (1951–52), Senator (1957–60) Tuālātai County

Ulufaleilupe Suāmeli. Member, HR, Tuālātai County, 1948–50.

Ulufaleilupe Sāfue Fuimaono(1917–1997). Senator, Tuālātai County, 1981–84.

== Demographics ==
Historical population
Year	Pop.	±%
1912	290	—
1920	333	+14.8%
1930	437	+31.2%
1940	527	+20.6%
1950	844	+60.2%
1960	1,008	+19.4%
1970	1,565	+55.3%
1980	2,171	+38.7%
1990	2,568	+18.3%
2000	2,987	+16.3%
2010	3,561	+19.2%
2020	3,010	−15.5%
U.S. Decennial Census

Tuālātai County was first recorded beginning with the 1912 special census. Regular decennial censuses were taken beginning in 1920.

== Villages ==
- Fūtiga
- Itū'au
- Taputimu
- Vailoatai
