= Futiga, American Samoa =

Futiga Fūtiga
- Village
- Location within American Samoa
- Coordinates: 14°21′12″S 170°45′15″W
- Country: United States
- Territory: American Samoa
- County: Tualatai

Area
  - Total: 1.67 sq mi (4.33 km^{2})

Population (2020)
  - Total: 682
  - Density: 408/sq mi (158/km^{2})

Futiga (Samoan: Fūtiga; Samoan pronunciation: [fuːtiŋa]) is a village in the southwest of Tutuila Island, American Samoa. It is located inland, 7 miles (11 km) southwest of Pago Pago, between the villages of 'Ili'ili and Puapua. It is in Tualatai County.

Futiga is home of the Fagatele Bay Site, an archeological site which was added to the U.S. National Register of Historic Places in 1997.

Futiga is the southernmost town in the United States (because it includes Steps Point). (Rose Atoll is farther south, but is uninhabited.)

== Etymology ==
The name of the village, Futiga, is derived from the Samoan language and translates into English as “Plucking place".

== Geography ==
Fagatele Bay Trail is a 1-mile (1.6 km) roundtrip hiking trail to the Fagatele Bay National Marine Sanctuary from the village of Futiga. Fagatele Bay National Marine Sanctuary is a protected nature area home to animals such as turtles and sharks. When traveling west on Route 1 to Futiga, turn left just before US Mart. Follow the road past the landfill until you reach a locked gate. The trailhead is located here.

Fogamaʻa Crater is a 485-acre (196 ha) site on the shoreline in the village of Futiga. The crater lies immediately inland from Larsen Bay, which makes up two smaller coves, Fogāma'a and Fagalua. The crater illustrates the most recent episode of volcanism in American Samoa.

Futiga is home to the only landfill site in American Samoa. In 2018, it was reported that the landfill only had two years left before it reached its limit. American Samoa Power Authority was unable to find another site in the territory and instead began recompacting the site in Futiga. By digging up the landfill and recompacting it, the landfill may be usable for up to fifteen years longer.

== Fagatele Bay National Marine Sanctuary ==
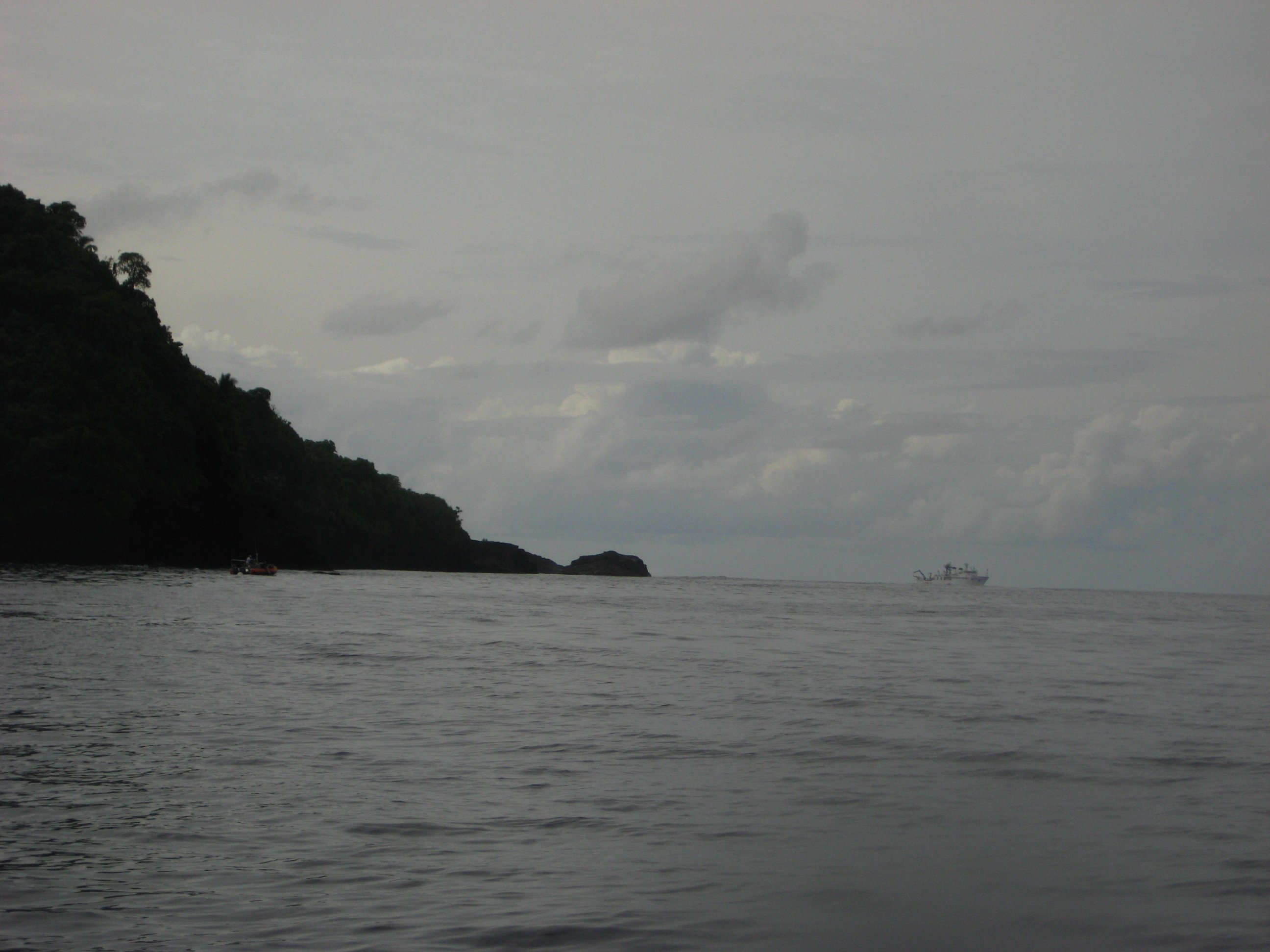
Steps Point

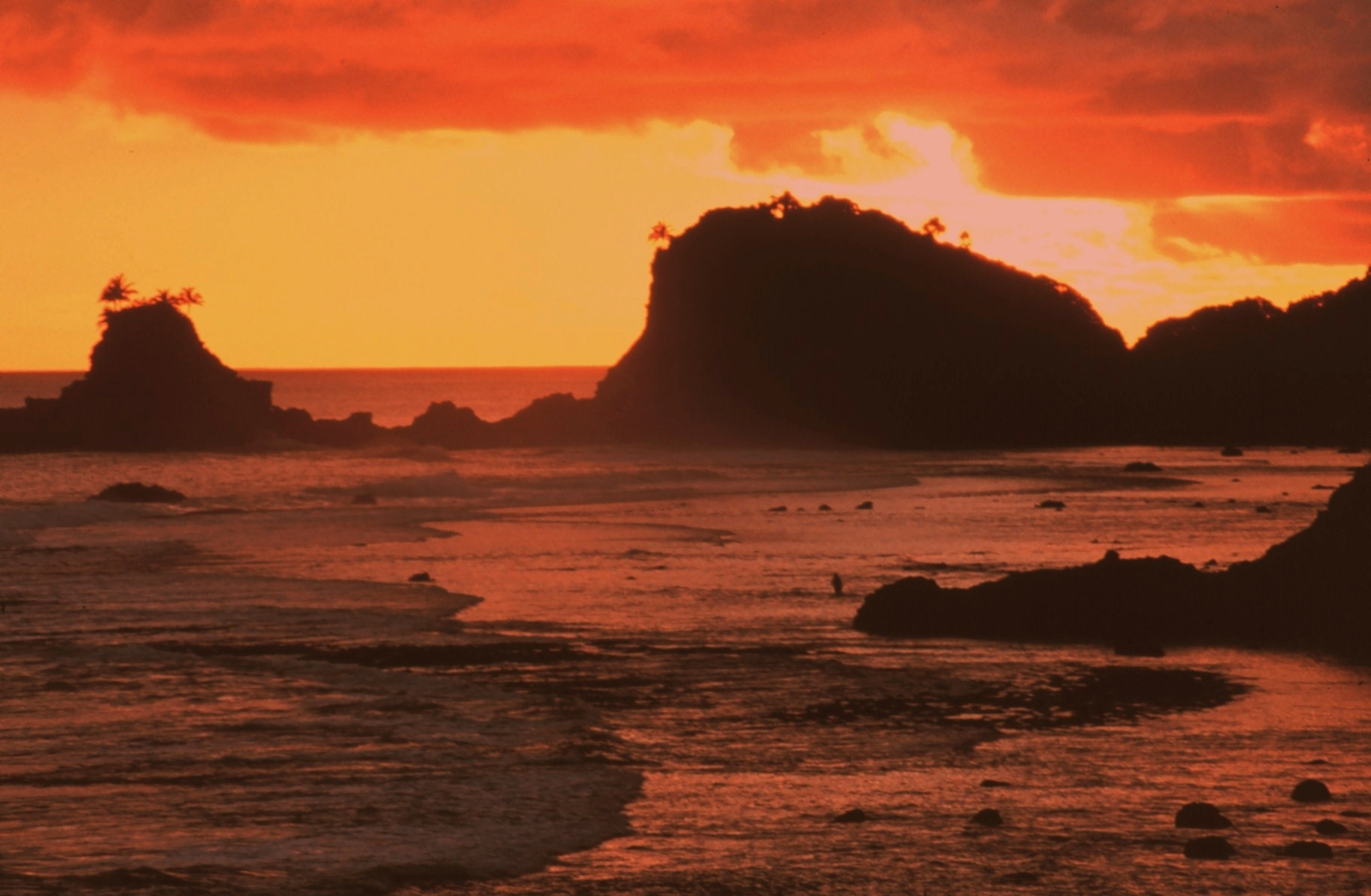
Fagatele Bay sunset

Access to Fagatele Bay National Marine Sanctuary is from the village of Futiga. Fagatele Bay is within National Marine Sanctuary of American Samoa and is one of two designated National Marine Sanctuaries in American Samoa. It is home to various species of animals, including hawksbill and green sea turtles. The nearest village is Taputimu, but the only access to the sanctuary is from Futiga.

Fagatele Bay is a submerged volcanic crater surrounded by steep cliffs. It contains the last remaining stretch of coastal rainforest on Tutuila Island. A trail leads along Matautuloa Ridge to the lighthouse on the headland at Steps Point.

== Demographics ==
Year	Population
2020	682
2010	723
2000	731
1990	720
1980	322
1970	288
1960	205
1950	166
1940	68
1930	36

== Notable people ==
- A. U. Fuimaono, first Delegate-at-Large to the U.S. Congress from American Samoa. Also Director of Agriculture, Secretary of Samoan Affairs, and Senator.
