= Taputimu, American Samoa =

Taputimu
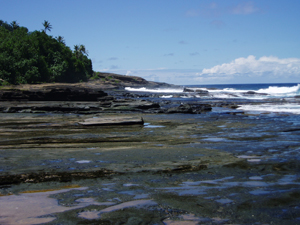
- Leala Shoreline National Natural Landmark

- Location within American Samoa
- Coordinates: 14°21′37″S 170°46′23″W
- Territory: American Samoa
- Island: Tutuila Island

Population (2020)
  - Total: 709

Taputimu is a village in southwestern Tutuila Island in American Samoa. It is the nearest village to the Fagatele Bay National Marine Sanctuary, although the main access is from the neighboring village of Futiga. It is home to Leala Shoreline National Natural Landmark and Leala Sliding Rock. Leala Sliding Rock is a natural rock formation between Vailoatai and Taputimu, which is a scenic landmark as well as a natural playground or slide. It was created by the ebb and flow of the ocean; the erosion has created a smooth shoreline site. It is located in Tualatai County in the Western District of Tutuila.

Leʻala Shoreline National Natural Landmark is 35 acres (14 ha) and was designated in 1972. Leala Sliding Rock is accessible from Taputimu. Taputimu Tide Pools are located nearby and are accessible for swimming at low tide.

The name of the village, Taputimu, is derived from the Samoan language and translates into English as “Sacred Rain".

== History ==
In 1932, Governor George Landenberger founded the American Samoa Department of Agriculture. The department initiated an experimental farm in Taputimu; however, the project saw limited success due to inexperienced management.

In the early 1930s, Samoan craftsmen built traditional fales on an oval-shaped plot at Taputimu, situated close to the ocean. Alongside these, a wooden schoolhouse and a residence for the teacher were constructed under the initiative of the Barstow Foundation. The Taputimu school was designed to accommodate only 18 boys, who were selected by the Governor based on recommendations from the matai, with an aim to include representatives from all counties whenever possible. Emphasizing quality, the selection process ensured that no boy was excluded due to having a part-Samoan heritage. The curriculum offered a blend of Samoan history, culture, and arts, alongside English language studies, Western legal principles, concepts of private property and personal rights, as well as lessons on the government, history, geography, and social structures of Europe and the United States. The school was given a five-year period to demonstrate its effectiveness. When it commenced operations in September 1935, it marked the first instance of private philanthropy in American Samoa, aside from the Red Cross, and quickly proved its value.

== Demographics ==
Year	Population
2020	709
2010	841
2000	640
1990	520
1980	434
1970	391
1960	234
1950	212
1940	169
1930	101

From 1980 to 1990, Taputimu's population grew from 434 to 520 persons, which represented an annual growth rate of 1.98%. The proportion of inhabitants who were born abroad nearly tripled between 1985 and 1990. About 105 homes were located in the village in 1995. As of 1995, Taputimu was home to five commercial businesses which included four grocery stores.
