= Fagatele Bay Site =

- U.S. National Register of Historic Places
- Nearest city: Futiga, American Samoa
- Area: 2.3 acres (0.93 ha)
- NRHP reference No.: 87001958
- Added to NRHP: June 2, 1997

The Fagatele Bay Site is an archaeological site on the shore of Fagatele Bay on the south side of Tutuila, the main island of the United States territory of American Samoa. The site shows evidence of habitation from prehistoric to historic times, and is well preserved in part because of the relative difficulty of land access to the area. It has ten distinct features, including raised platforms, stone walls, and a stone-line path. In one feature, interpreted as a house site, a complete prehistoric-era adze was found. When surveyed in 1985, these features could not be chronologically organized or correlated.

The site was listed on the National Register of Historic Places in 1997.

The name of the bay, Fagatele, is derived from the Samoan language and translates into English as “Great bay".

== See also ==
- National Register of Historic Places listings in American Samoa
