= Larsen Bay (American Samoa) =

Bight in Western District, American Samoa

Coordinates: 14°21′47″S 170°44′59″W

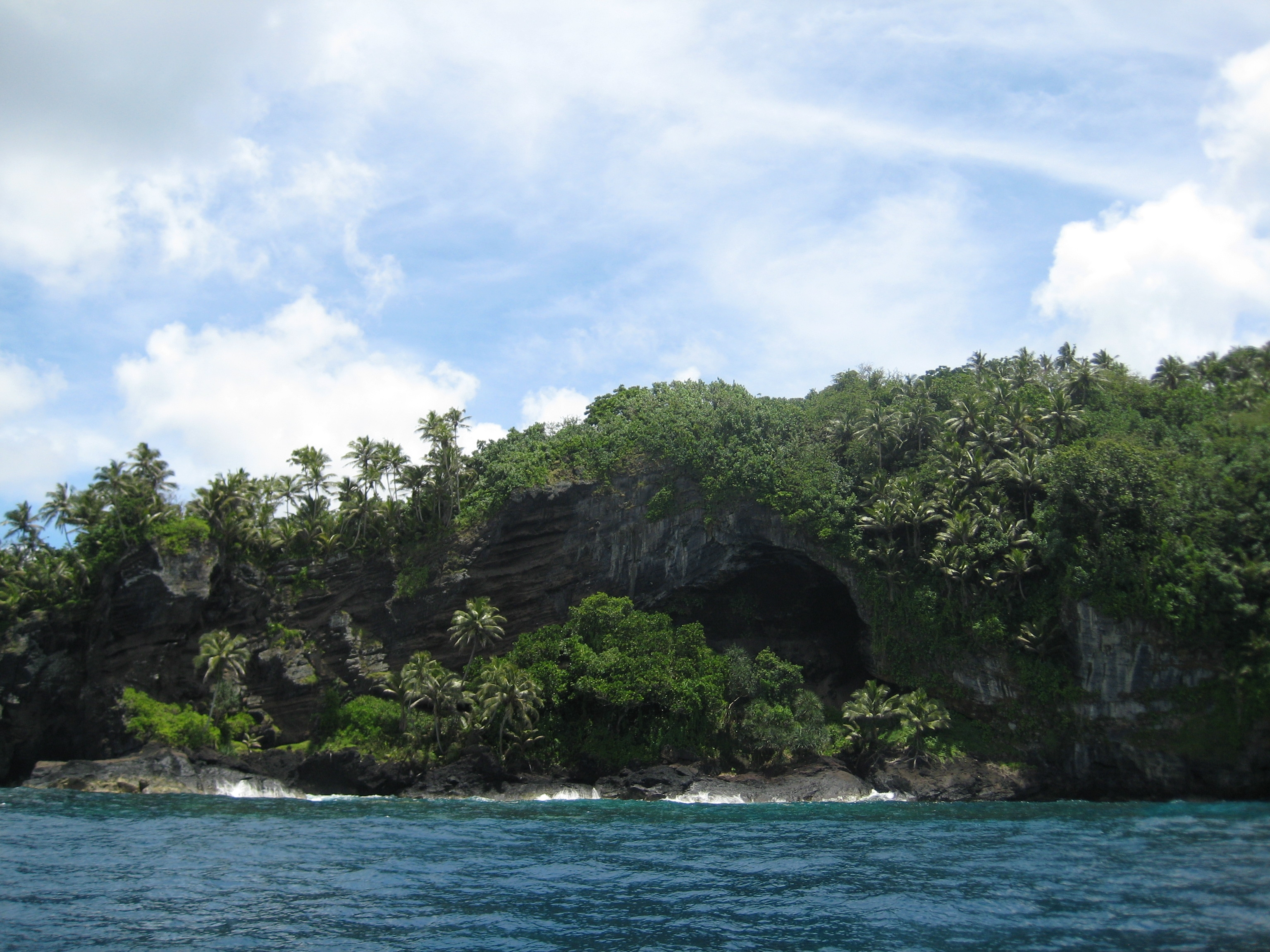
A cave in the lava formation at Larsen's Bay.

Larsen Bay is a bay in the Western District, American Samoa. Comparable to its neighboring Fagatele Bay, Larsen Bay serves as a vital habitat for marine biodiversity. Larsen Bay, covering approximately 0.46 square miles, is located east of Fagatele Bay, stretching from Steps Point to Sail Rock. The bay features a steep descent to depths exceeding 500 meters and is characterized by rich coral coverage and diverse marine species.

== Geology ==
The bay's geological foundation stems from volcanic activity, with its surrounding terrain shaped by erosion and volcanic collapse. Its proximity to Fagatele Bay and Fogāmaʻa Crater underscores its origin within the island's dynamic volcanic history. The unconsolidated ash and cinder deposits from Larsen Bay to Olotele Mountain provide essential geological insight into the region's formative processes. There are two coves at Larsen Bay: Fogāmaʻa Cove and Fagalua Cove.

== Ecology ==
Larsen Bay mirrors the ecological structure of Fagatele Bay, making it a hotspot for coral and fish species richness. Surveys conducted in 2004 and 2006 indicated an above-average coral cover and a high proportion of large coral colonies. The presence of the calcified red alga Peyssonnelia was particularly abundant. Additionally, the bay supports turtle nesting and harbors buried archaeological deposits in Fagalua Cove. The National Marine Sanctuary of American Samoa, established in 1985, expanded protection to Larsen Bay in July 2012.

== History ==
During World War II, a contingent of U.S. Marines, including the Weapons Platoon of Company B, was stationed at the remote Fagalua Cove within Larsen's Bay. The Marines resided there for several months, dedicating their time to constructing fortifications and shelters as well as conducting weapons training.

== Fauna ==
Larsen's Bay hosts a rich avian population, including the Brown Noddy, which is abundant both in Larsen's Bay and the neighboring area of Fagatele. The Blue-gray Noddy, another notable species, is fairly common and serves as a resident breeder within the bay. Additionally, this species roosts and nests in Larsen's Bay and at nearby Steps Point. The Gray-backed Tern, although an uncommon resident on Tutuila Island, nests there and is frequently observed in and around Larsen's Bay. Marine wildlife in Larsen's Bay includes occasional sightings of the Black Turtle, recorded in small numbers.

== See also ==
- Le'ala Shoreline National Natural Landmark
