= Steps Point =

Peninsula in American Samoa

Coordinates: 14°22′23″S 170°45′35″W

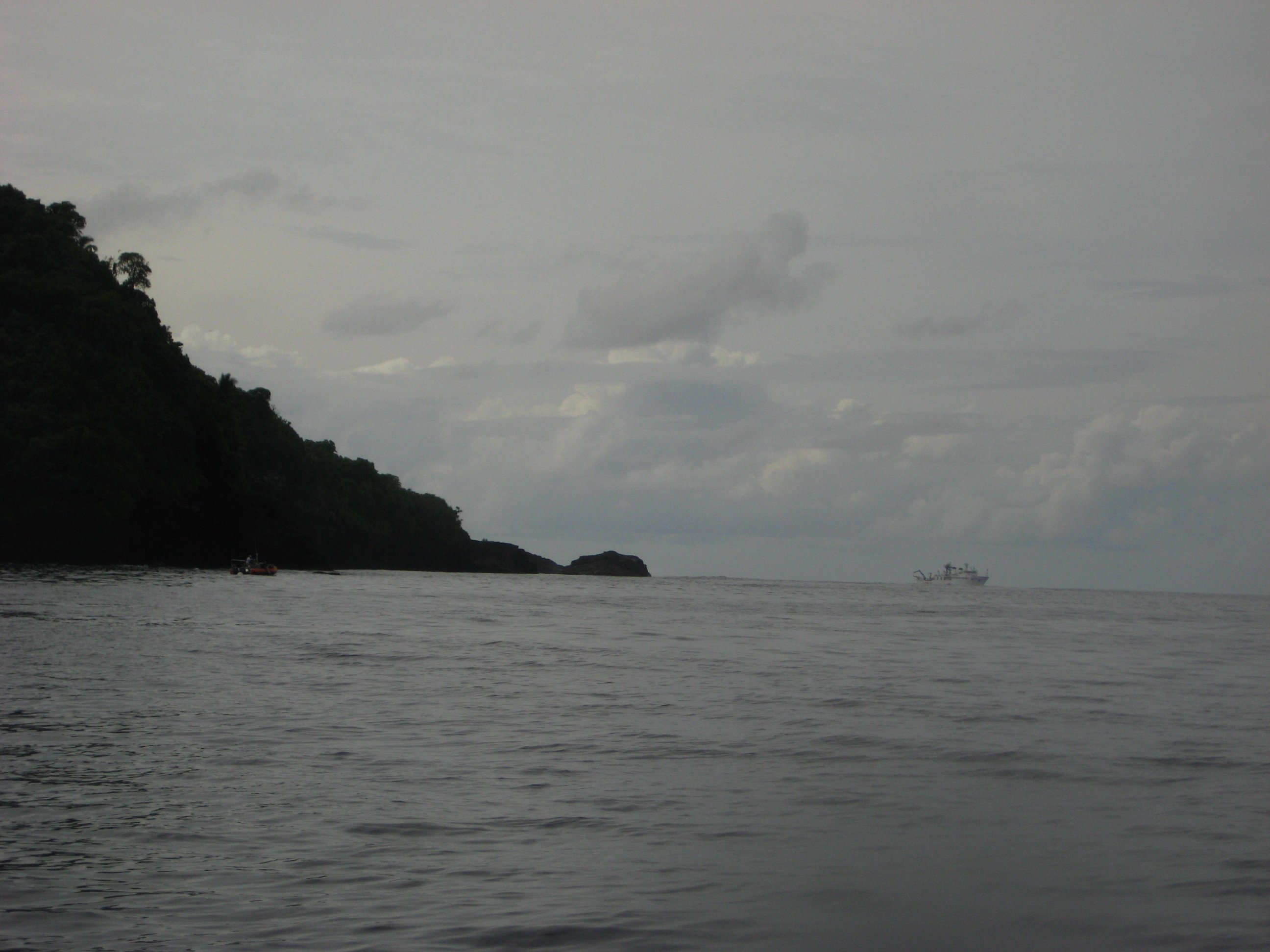

Steps Point is the southern extremity of Tutuila Island in American Sāmoa. It is a small peninsula located between Fagatele Bay and Larsen Bay. It is in Tuālā-tai County in the Western District of Tutuila Island. 1.5 kilometres (0.93 mi) past the village of Futiga going west, a secondary road turns off to the left to Steps Point.

Steps Point is a vital habitat for a variety of seabirds in American Sāmoa. The uncommon Black noddy forms small colonies here, while the cliffs provide nesting grounds for the Brown booby, which is also uncommon on Tutuila. Red-footed boobies and Gray-backed terns are frequently observed in the area, along with the Blue-gray noddy, which both nests and roosts at Steps Point. Coastal colonies of the White tern are also a common sight.
