= Leʻala Shoreline =

Shoreline on Tutuila Island in American Samoa

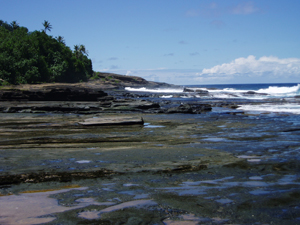
- Interactive map of Leʻala Shoreline
- Location: Taputimu, American Samoa
- Coordinates: 14.360°S 170.777°W
- Created: 1972
- Designation: National Natural Landmark

Leʻala Shoreline is located near Taputimu, just west of Fagatele Point, on Tutuila Island in American Samoa. It is a U.S. National Natural Landmark. The coast is marked by rocky outcroppings, deep and shallow surge channels, as well as tide pools and a mixture of coconut, scrub and grass forest. Sliding Rock is located nearby. Leʻala Shoreline is a young flow of basalt, inter-bedded with layers of tuff that illustrate erosion by wave action. The area is covered with dense tropical vegetation. Leʻala Shoreline was designated a U.S. National Natural Landmark in 1972. The National Natural Landmark covers 35 acres (14 ha).

The Leʻala Shoreline Trail begins in Vailoatai and follows the shoreline through thick tropical vegetation with periodic views of the Leaʻala Shoreline National Natural Landmark. The steep trail travels in and out of ancient volcanic craters before ending at a junction with the Fagatele Bay National Marine Sanctuary Trail. It is a 3.2-mile (5.1 km) roundtrip hike.

Petroglyphs can be seen near the Leʻala Shoreline on the coast at Avaloa Point. Taputimu Tide Pools are located nearby and are accessible for swimming at low tide.

== See also ==
- List of National Natural Landmarks in American Samoa
