= Vailoatai, American Samoa =

Vailoatai
- Village
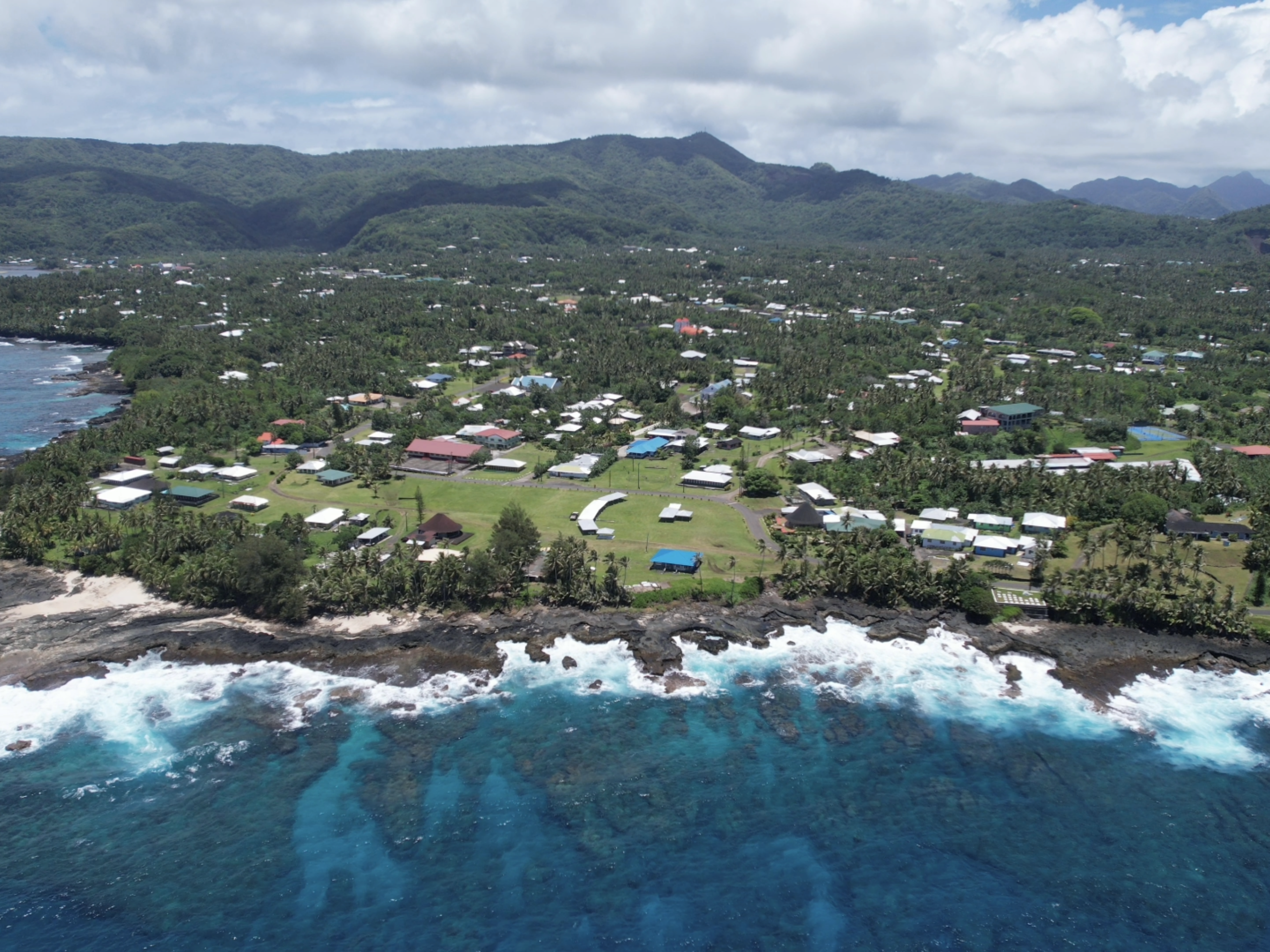
- Etymology: Samoan: "le vai na le iloa"
- Nickname: Tuālā
- Motto(s): Sā Le Fo’i; Village Colors: Green and Yellow/Gold
- Location within American Samoa
- Coordinates: 14°21′05″S 170°46′55″W
- Country: United States
- Territory: American Samoa
- Island: Tutuila Island
- Named for: Samoan Mythology

Area
  - Land: 0.41 sq mi (1.1 km^{2})

Population (2020)
  - Total: 1,195
  - Density: 2,900/sq mi (1,100/km^{2})
- Time zone: UTC−11 (Samoa Time Zone)
- ZIP Code: 96799
- Area code: +1 684

Vailoatai is a village in southwestern Tutuila, the main island of American Samoa. It is located on the eastern end of Leone Bay. The village is known for its beautiful malae (ceremonial village-green), nested along the island's rugged southern coast and lined by the fale tali mālō (guest houses) of its village chiefs.

The original name of the village was Tuāulu. In 1926, Tuāulu and another village called Vailoa, combined to form the Vailoa-tai village. Although the village is officially named Vailoatai according to the American Samoa Constitution, "Vailoa-tai" really only refers to the area of village towards the sea ["tai" - the side towards the sea or seaside]. Other areas of the village include Vailoa-uta ["uta"- the side towards the land or inland] and Falīlī. Together, the village as a whole is commonly referred to as Vailoa.

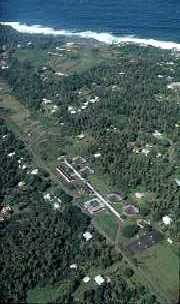
View of Vailoa-uta and Le'alā Shoreline

Vailoatai along with Taputimu, Itū'au (Malaeloa) and Fūtiga form the itūmālō (county/district) of Tuālātai. The village serves as the county's principality as the titular head of the district (fa'asuaga) is located here.

== Etymology ==
The Vailoa name is short for "le vai na le iloa" (the unknown/unseen water) in reference to the legend of a time long ago when King Tuimanu'a and his traveling party stopped in the area and the difficulty they encountered in their search for water.

Another version is that the Vailoa name is short for "vai-vai-loloa" (land always covered with water) in reference to the Vailoa-uta area that was covered by water or a lake. The area is still prone to flooding during heavy rains due to its geography.

The name of the village, Vailoa-uta, is derived from the Samoan language and translates into English as “Long River Inland".

== Pre-1900 history ==
Vailoatai is a historical marker of the Ātua (a political district of 'Upolu) migration to Tutuila with many Vailoa family names originating from the Ātua sub-district of Faleālili. The village honors this legacy to this day, recognizing Faleālili in its fa’alupega (ceremonial greetings).

The migration of Ātua families to Tutuila occurred after the defeat of Mālietoa by Tui Ātua in the 16th century. The political effect of this migration was the addition of six more counties to the original four counties of Tutuila to make the overall organization of the island in keeping with the 'Upolu pattern.

The village and the district became a proponent of this government (mālō) as can be seen in the old Samoan parable, the War between Tuveve and Sātele.

Fofō ma Aitūlagi (an honorific that is still used to refer to the entire western district) became le Falelima i Sisifo (the five houses of the west), which includes Ālātaua, Fofō, Leāsina (Aitūlagi), Tuālā-tai and Tuālā-uta (Ma’upū) counties.

Sua ma Vāifanua (an honorific that is still used to refer to the entire eastern district) became le Falelima i Sasa’e (the five houses of the east), which includes Itū'au (ma Nofoa), Ma’opūtasi (Launiusaelua), Sā’ole, Sua and Vāifanua counties.

The raising of the U.S. flag over Tutuila saw the end of Ātua's influence over the island, much to the relief of local chiefs who were tired of the endless wars in 'Upolu. They did not want to remain under the control of 'Upolu paramount chiefs, Germany or Great Britain. PC's Sātele of Vailoa and Fuimaono of Aoloau/Vailoa were two of the signatories to the Tutuila Deed of Cession in 1900.

== Fa'alupega: Ceremonial Greetings of Vailoatai ==
Afio mai lau afioga Sātele o le alo o Salamāsina

Afio mai alo o Fānene

Susū mai le sa'o o Tuiāsina ma le 'āiga sā Tuiāsinā

Alala mai lau tōfā Maiavatele, ma le fofoga ole Availopā

Mamalu mai le 'āiga Faletolu ma Faleālili

- Although the above is the only referenced/cited fa'alupega the contributor has for the village, it is not the one currently in use. Refer to a chief of the village for the correct fa'alupega.
- Titles greeted with "susū mai" are typically associated with Sā Malietoa titles while "afio mai" are Sā Tupua related.

== 20th century ==
In 1907, the village celebrated the opening of its first Christian chapel with the London Missionary Society (LMS). LMS missionaries note that an elaborate feast marked the special occasion with attendance by dignitaries and family members from around the island.

In 1915, the Manu'a islands suffered severe damage from a hurricane, and the village hosted (among other villages in Tutuila) many residents from Manu'a while relief efforts took place there.

In 1926, the three-part village council of Vailoa (-uta), Tuāulu, and Falīlī decided to consolidate the village to where it is now called Vailoa-tai.

In 1934, the Marist Le'alā School for boys opened up in the area between Vailoatai and Taputimu. The school, however, is no longer in existence.

During World War II, U.S. Marines built an airstrip that spanned Leone, Vailoa-uta and Taputimu. The whole area was leased by the American Samoa Government and the federal government to construct a back-up airstrip for the main airport at Tafuna during World War II. It was started early in 1943 - probably in January. It was completed on 30 September 1943.

Unfortunately, the airstrip could not be used due to prevailing winds, which made take-offs difficult. Only two planes were able to make use of the airstrip before it was abandoned. Government facilities and residential units have since been built over the old airstrip.

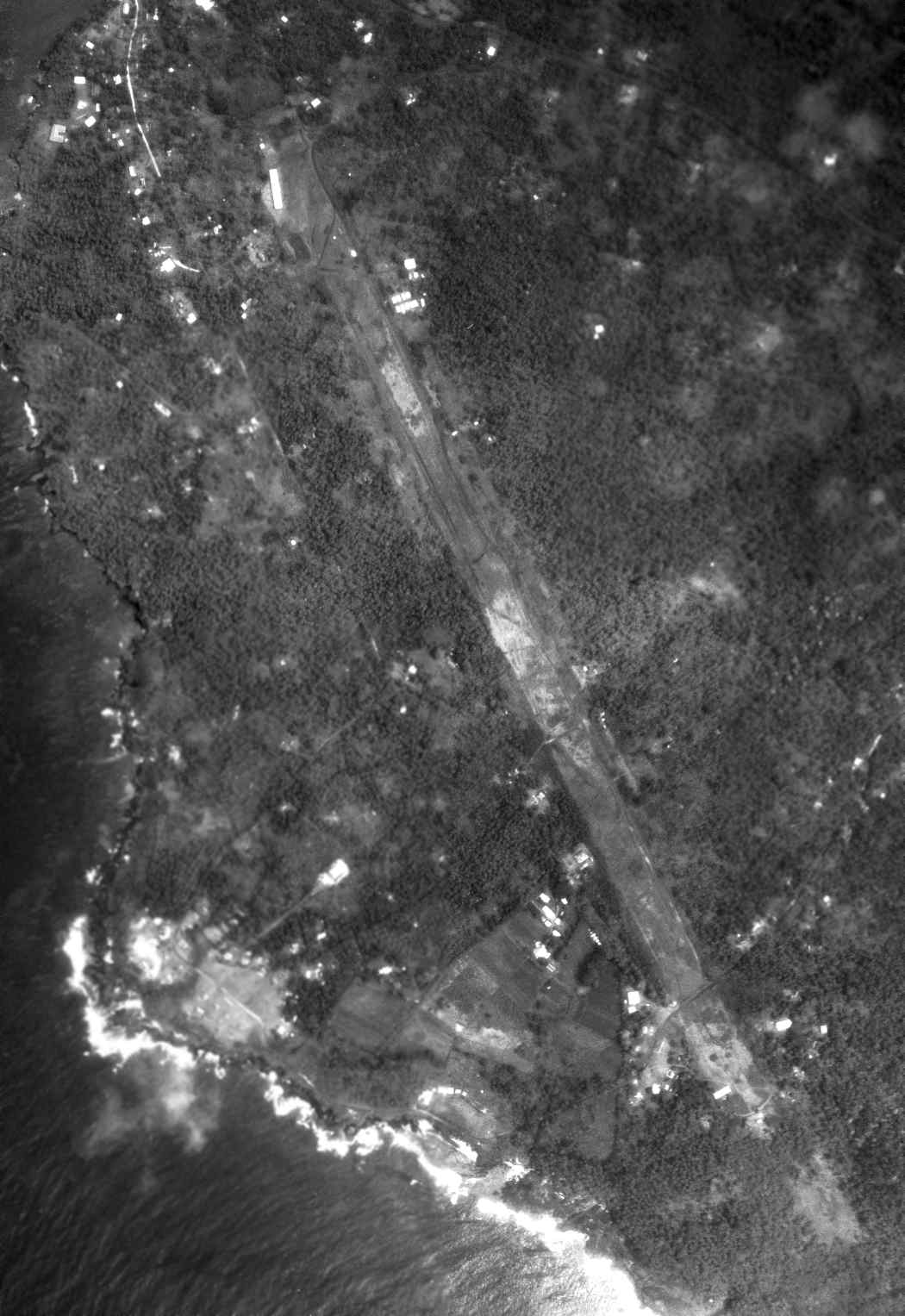
Leone Airfield, Taputimu, American Samoa

In September 1965, Leone High School was opened in the Vailoa-uta area of the village. The school was designed for students from the Western District and transfer students from Manu'a. Village elders note that the malae of Vailoa was once located where the high school stands today.

In May 1968, the government radio station WVUV-AM moved from Utulei and began operations at its new quarters in Vailoatai, next to Leone High School.

In the early 1970s, Governor Haydon pushed to privatize the station despite opposition from the Fono. By 1975, the Federal Communications Commission (FCC) approved the application by Radio Samoa, Ltd. to take over WVUV-AM from the government.

By the late 90's, the old station had gone off air and is now defunct. South Seas Broadcasting, Inc. bought what was left of the station, and in 2008, opened WVUV-FM at the Aitūlagi Building office complex in Tafuna.

== Flag Day ==
Vailoatai has been a proud participant in the territory's annual celebration and commemoration of the April 17, 1900 raising of the American flag, performing the siva ma pese (song and dance) portion of the Flag Day event in 1988, 1998, 2004, 2010, 2012 and 2014.

The village regularly participates in the Flag Day's cricket (men's and women's) games and fautasi (traditional Samoan long boat) races.

However, the last year the village fautasi, the Fa'asaulala, participated in the annual race was 2014.

The village also performed its siva ma pese program for the Independent State of Samoa's celebration of their independence day in 2010 and 2012.

== Fa'asaulala Record History ==
Fa'asaulala – to be demanding, exacting

Pre-Christian meaning – to be oppressive, to be tyrannical

1913 - [24 -34 OARS] 3RD PLACE (OUT OF 3)

1947 - 1ST PLACE (OUT OF 3)

1948 - 2ND PLACE (OUT OF 2)

1979 - 1ST PLACE (UNKNOWN)

1982 - 2ND PLACE (OUT OF 3)

1987 - 5TH PLACE (OUT OF 9)

1996 - 2ND PLACE (OUT OF 7)

1997 - 5TH PLACE (OUT OF 7)

2000 - 4TH PLACE (OUT OF 6)

2001 - DRAW

2002 - 5TH PLACE (OUT OF 8)

2003 - 4TH PLACE (OUT OF 6)

2005 - 3RD PLACE (OUT OF 8)

2006 - 4TH PLACE (OUT OF 9)

2008 - 5TH PLACE (OUT OF 8)

2009 (BLUE SKY RACE) - TIED FOR 6TH PLACE (OUT OF 8)

2014 - 8TH PLACE (OUT OF 9)

== Founding legend ==
In the book, Ole Manuō o Tala Tu’u ma Fisaga o Tala Ave, the village of Vailoa defeated the cannibal king Tuife’ai with the assistance of two brothers from Ātua, High Chiefs Lutu and Solosolo. The two brothers then sailed further east and established themselves as Sa'ousoali'i of Launiusaelua.

Fagatogo elders believe the brothers received the name of their village malae, Malaeoletalu, from this war. Malaeoletalu is also the name of the malae of the Sālesātele village in Falealīlī.

Tuāulu was specifically set aside to prepare human sacrifices for Tuife'ai during his reign. A forceful blow was applied to the back of the head, or tuāulu, using a traditional heavy war club like the talavalu.

In 1926, Tuāulu and Vailoa combined to form the Vailoatai village.

Tuife'ai is a title that has many tala (legends) from Manu'a, Tutuila and 'Upolu. Sunia notes that the title goes back as far as 500 A.D., and that the Tuife'ai of that time is responsible for the first failed invasion of the Manu'a kingdom.

The title established familial ties with the Mālietoa in the 13th or 14th century and was later renamed Tuisāmoa of the Poutasi village, Falealīlī.

== Historical sites ==
Asotau is the name of the village malae. It is a historical marker of the Tafa'ifā I’amafana's failed invasion of Manu’a in the 18th century. The counties of Sua and Vāifanua rallied under PC Le’iato to expel I’amafana's forces from Tuālātai, where the king sought refuge under the protection of his relative, PC Sātele, during his retreat from Manu’a.

After a battle ensued, the conflict was resolved peacefully via a traditional style intercession known as a seumālō. King I’amafana and his forces returned to 'Upolu, and the village took the words ‘aso tau’ (Day of War) as the name of its malae to commemorate the event.

If you look closely, you'll notice that the layout of the malae was modeled after that of a Samoan chiefly guesthouse. Each of the faletalimālō at the perimeter of the malae is like each of the posts of a guest house, just on a larger scale.

== Notable landmarks ==
- Faleāpoi Point

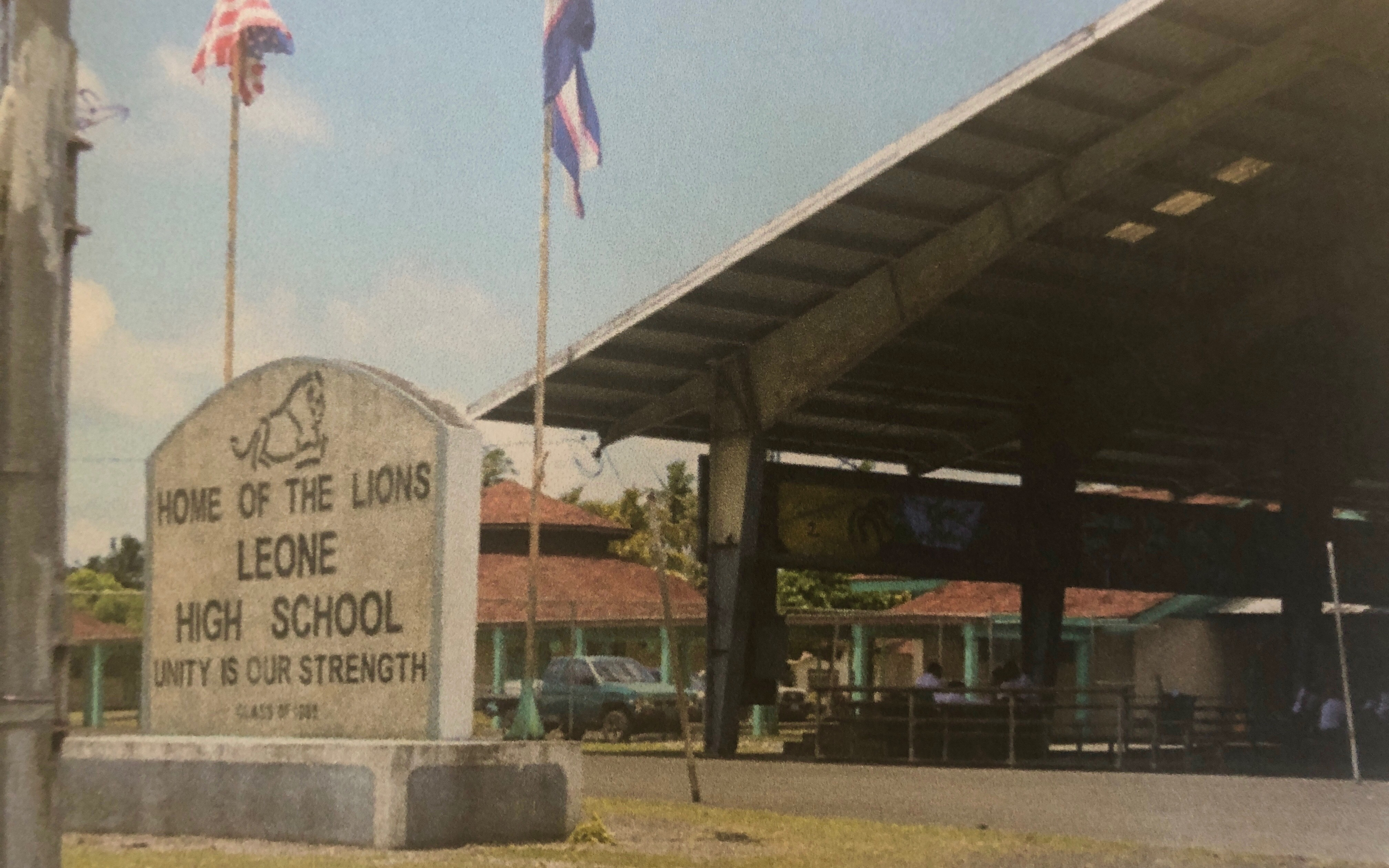
Leone High School

- Leone High School is a senior high school in Vailoatai and Leone, Western District, American Samoa.

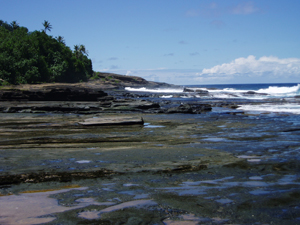
Le'alā Shoreline National Natural Landmark

- Leʻala Shoreline National Natural Landmark, encompassing a section of Vailoatai through Taputimu, is 35 acres (14 ha) and was designated in 1972.
- Papafa'ase'e Cove
- Pupuāloa Point
- Vailoatai Crater

== Demographics ==
Year	Population
2020	1195
2010	1447
2000	989
1990	805
1980	677

== Notable people ==
- Adele Salamāsina Sātele-Galea’i (March 25, 1951 - August 4, 2012). Dr. Sātele-Galea'i was the former Director of the Office of Manpower Resources (today, Dept. of Human Resources) from 1983 to 1985, and President of the American Samoa Community College from 2000 to 2007.
- Elisara, Le'alā (1936–2019). Museum Curator for the Jean P. Haydon Museum in Fagatogo. Remembered for her efforts to encourage local arts. In 1999, Governor Tauese Sunia appointed her as Director of Arts Council.
- Eni Fa'aua'ā Hunkin Faleomavaega Jr. (August 15, 1943 – February 22, 2017) was an American Samoan politician who served as the territory's lieutenant governor and congressional delegate.
- Fagaoalii Sātele Sunia (c. 1946 – September 5, 2015) was an American Samoan literacy advocate and educator. She served as the First Lady of American Samoa from January 1997 to March 2003 during the tenure of her husband, former Governor Tauese Sunia, who died in office in 2003.
- Galumalemana William "Bill" Guthrie Sātele, High Chief (HC), was a longtime businessman who also served as the Chief Revenue Officer, Budget Officer, Director of Parks & Recreation, Historic Preservation Office and Fono liaison for the American Samoa Government (ASG); served three terms as the Faipule for the Tuālā-tai district.
- Lopā Seti, High Talking Chief (HTC), Member, HR, Tuālā-tai 1995–2000. US Army Retired. Both he and Representative Avegalio Aigamaua met with Samoa's Deputy Prime Minister Tuilaepa Sailele and the leader of the opposition, Tuiatua Tupua Tamasese, to obtain support for changing that country's name back to Western Samoa in 1997.
- Lopā Dr. Tiamu, High Talking Chief (HTC), Member, HR, Tuālā-tai, 1967–68. Dr. Lopā received his training in dentistry at the Central Medical School in Fiji, returning in 1957.
- Maiavatele Pouono Hunkin, High Talking Chief (HTC), Senator, Tuālā-tai County, 1978–80. Maiava was the composer of some of the most popular Samoan songs such as OkaOka La’u Honey, Manu o le Vaveao and Le Itumalo Talofa. He taught public schools in both American and Western Samoa.
- Tuatagaloa Eni Hunkin, High Chief (HC), One of the Tuālā-tai delegates to the Am. Samoa 1960 Constitution Convention that addressed many important issues to include U.S. citizenship for the people of the territory.
- Tuiā Laumoli, (1948–2001), High Chief (HC), Member, HR, Tuālā-tai, 1987–94.
- Tuiāsina Le'aeno Reed (1924–1988), High Chief (HC), Member, HR, Tuālā-tai, 1965–66. One of the Tuālā-tai delegates to the Am. Samoa 1960 Constitution Convention. Later President of the Senate 1971–72, as Senator for Itu'au County under the Le'aeno matai title. Led the effort to create a retirement program for ASG employees.
