= American Samoa =

American territory in Polynesia

Coordinates: 14.3°S 170.7°W

American Samoa Amerika Sāmoa (Samoan)
- Self-governing unincorporated and unorganized U.S. territory
- Flag Seal
- Motto: "Sāmoa, Muamua Le Atua" (Samoan) (English: "Samoa, Let God Be First")
- Anthem: "Amerika Sāmoa" (regional) "The Star-Spangled Banner" (official)
- Location of American Samoa (circled in red)
- Sovereign state: United States (Note: Despite being under the sovereignty of the United States since 1900, American Samoa has not been fully incorporated into the country for constitutional purposes. See the page for the Insular Cases for more information.)
- Partition of Samoa: December 2, 1899
- Ratification Act: February 20, 1929
- Current constitution: July 1, 1967
- Capital: Pago Pago (Note: The constitution specifies the seat of government at Fagatogo, where the legislature, High Court and District Court are located. The executive office building is located in neighboring Utulei. These two villages are located along Pago Pago Harbor, whose largest village is Pago Pago. Many sources list Pago Pago as the capital, referring to the whole agglomeration around the harbor.)
- Government seat: Fagatogo
- Largest village: Tafuna
- Official languages: Samoan; English
- Ethnic groups: 83.2% Samoan; 5.8% Asian; 5.5% other Pacific Islander; 4.4% mixed; 1.1% other
- Religion (2020): Christianity (99.35%); Protestantism (76.16%); Independent (16.83%); Catholics (6.01%); Unaffiliated (0.35%); Other (~0.65%); Agnosticism (0.33%); Chinese folk religion (0.42%); Baháʼí Faith (0.16%); Buddhism (0.15%); Atheism (0.01%)
- Demonym(s): American Samoan
- Government: Devolved presidential constitutional dependency
  - President: Donald Trump (R)
  - Governor: Pula Nikolao Pula (R)
  - Lieutenant Governor: Pulu Ae Ae (R)
- Legislature: Fono
  - Upper house: Senate
  - Lower house: House of Representatives

United States Congress
  - House delegate: Amata Coleman Radewagen (R)

Area
  - Total: 77 sq mi (200 km^{2})
  - Water (%): 0
- Highest elevation: 966.2 m (3,170 ft)

Population
  - 2025 estimate: 43,268 (211th)
  - 2020 census: 49,710
  - Density: 670.8/sq mi (259.0/km^{2})
- GDP (PPP): 2021 estimate
  - Total: $709 million
  - Per capita: $15,743
- GDP (nominal): 2022 estimate
  - Total: $871 million
  - Per capita: $18,017
- HDI (2017): 0.827 very high
- Currency: United States dollar (US$) (USD)
- Time zone: UTC−11:00 (SST)
- Date format: mm/dd/yyyy
- Driving side: Right
- Calling code: +1
- USPS abbreviation: AS
- ISO 3166 code: AS; US-AS
- Internet TLD: .as
- Website: americansamoa.gov

American Samoa (Note: Samoan: Amerika Sāmoa, pronounced [aˈmɛɾika ˈsaːmʊa]; also Amelika Sāmoa or Sāmoa Amelika) is a self-governing, unincorporated and unorganized territory of the United States located in the south Pacific Ocean, within the Polynesia subregion of Oceania. It is 40 miles (64 km) southeast of the island country of Samoa, east of the International Date Line and the French territory of Wallis and Futuna, west of the Cook Islands, north of Tonga, and some 310 miles (500 km) south of Tokelau. American Samoa is the southernmost territory of the United States, situated 2,200 miles (3,500 km) southwest of the U.S. state of Hawaii, and one of two U.S. territories south of the Equator, along with the uninhabited Jarvis Island.

American Samoa consists of the eastern part of the Samoan archipelago – the inhabited volcanic islands of Tutuila, Aunuʻu, Ofu, Olosega and Taʻū and the uninhabited Rose Atoll – as well as Swains Island, a remote coral atoll in the Tokelau volcanic island group. The total land area is 77 square miles (199 km^{2}), slightly larger than Washington, D.C.; including its territorial waters, the total area is 117,500 square miles (304,000 km^{2}), about the size of New Zealand. American Samoa has a tropical climate, with 90 percent of its land covered by rainforests. As of 2024, the population is approximately 47,400 and concentrated on Tutuila, which hosts the capital and largest settlement, Pago Pago. The vast majority of residents are indigenous ethnic Samoans, most of whom are fluent in the official languages, Samoan and English.

Inhabited by Polynesians since prehistoric times, American Samoa was first contacted by Europeans in the 18th century. The islands attracted missionaries, explorers, and mariners, particularly to the highly protected natural harbor of Pago Pago. The United States took possession of American Samoa in the late 19th century, developing it into a major naval outpost; the territory's strategic value was reinforced by the Second World War and subsequent Cold War. In 1967, American Samoa became self-governing with the adoption of a constitution; its local government is republican in form, with separate executive, legislative, and judicial branches. It remains officially unorganized and is thus directly administered by the federal government. American Samoa is listed among seventeen "non-self-governing territories" as defined by the United Nations, but it is a member of several intergovernmental organizations, including the Pacific Community, Pacific Islands Forum (PIF), Alliance of Small Island States (AOSIS), and International Olympic Committee (IOC).

Due to the territory's strategic location, the U.S. military has a significant presence and plays a major role in its economy and society. The territory is noted for having the highest rate of military enlistment of any U.S. state or territory; as of 2021, the local U.S. Army recruiting station in Pago Pago ranked first in recruitment. Tuna products are the main exports, with the U.S. proper serving as the largest trading partner. Tourism is a nascent but underdeveloped sector, owing in part to the territory's relative geographic isolation, which also accounts for its high rate of poverty and emigration.

Since the Deeds of Cession were signed in 1900 and 1904, Samoans have avoided further integration into the U.S. system. In 1949, the Department of the Interior moved to incorporate American Samoa through an Organic Act. Afraid that incorporation might undermine the Samoan culture and traditional land ownership, Samoan matai intervened and Congress halted incorporation. Instead, Samoa created its own government, the Samoan Fono, based on indigenous systems of governance. Since then, Samoans have declined to establish a federal district court and refused birthright citizenship; Samoa remains the only U.S. territory with its own immigration system.

American Samoa is the only permanently inhabited territory of the United States in which citizenship is not granted at birth, and people born there are considered "non-citizen nationals" with limited rights. American Samoa does not have a vote in the U.S. Congress. A primary reason that Samoans do not have birthright citizenship is that it is opposed by many Samoans, as evidenced by the unanimous resolution of the Samoan Fono in 2021 against birthright citizenship, and multiple statements and actions by government officials over the decades. The elected representatives of American Samoan people unanimously fear that birthright citizenship would complicate the territory's political structure and lead to the erosion of indigenous governance, collective ownership of indigenous lands, and use of the Samoan language.

== Etymology ==
The origin of the name "Samoa" means "holy center", taken from a compound of the Samoan sa ("sacred") and moa ("center"). The name is alternatively derived from a local chieftain named Samoa or an indigenous word meaning "place of the moa", a now-extinct bird, though the bird was known only from New Zealand.

Although the sovereign state of Samoa changed its name from Western Samoa in 1997, the territory is also sometimes referred to as Eastern Samoa to distinguish it from its neighbor.

== History ==
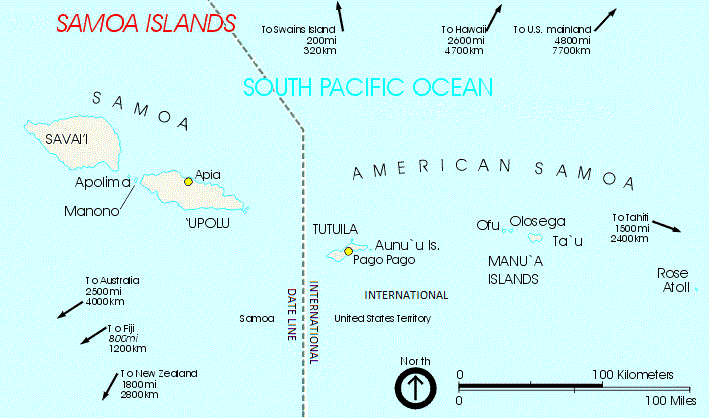
Samoa Islands

Traditional oral literature of Samoa and Manuʻa talks of a widespread Polynesian network or confederacy (or "empire") that was prehistorically ruled by the successive Tui Manuʻa dynasties. Manuan genealogies and religious oral literature also suggest that the Tui Manuʻa had long been one of the most prestigious and powerful paramounts of Samoa. Oral history suggests that the Tui Manuʻa kings governed a confederacy of far-flung islands which included Tutuila, as well as smaller western Pacific chiefdoms and Polynesian outliers such as Uvea, Futuna, Tokelau, Tuvalu and bigger islands like the Samoa in the North. Commerce and exchange routes between the western Polynesian societies are well documented and it is speculated that the Tui Manuʻa dynasty grew through its success in obtaining control and manufacturing goods such as finely woven ceremonial mats "('Ie Konga)" for the Tu'i Tonga, whale ivory "tabua" for their Fijian masters, obsidian and basalt tools, chiefly red feathers, and seashells reserved for royalty (such as polished nautilus and the egg cowry).

=== 18th century: First Western contacts ===
Contact with Europeans began in the early 18th century. Dutchman Jacob Roggeveen was the first known European to sight the Samoan Islands in 1722, calling them the "Baumann Islands" after one of his captains. The next explorer to visit the islands was Louis-Antoine de Bougainville, who named them the "Îles des Navigateurs" in 1768. British explorer James Cook recorded the island names in 1773, but never visited.

The 1789 visit by Lapérouse was ended by an attack, on Tutuila island where Lapérouse's men were trying to obtain water. His second in command Capt. de Langle, and scientist Robert de Lamanon and several of his crew were surrounded by over a thousand Samoans and killed. La Pérouse named the island "Massacre Island", and the bay near Aasu is still called Massacre Bay.

HMS Pandora, under the command of Admiral Edward Edwards (Royal Navy officer), visited the island in 1791 during its search for the H.M.S. Bounty mutineers. Von Kotzebue visited in 1824.

=== 19th century ===
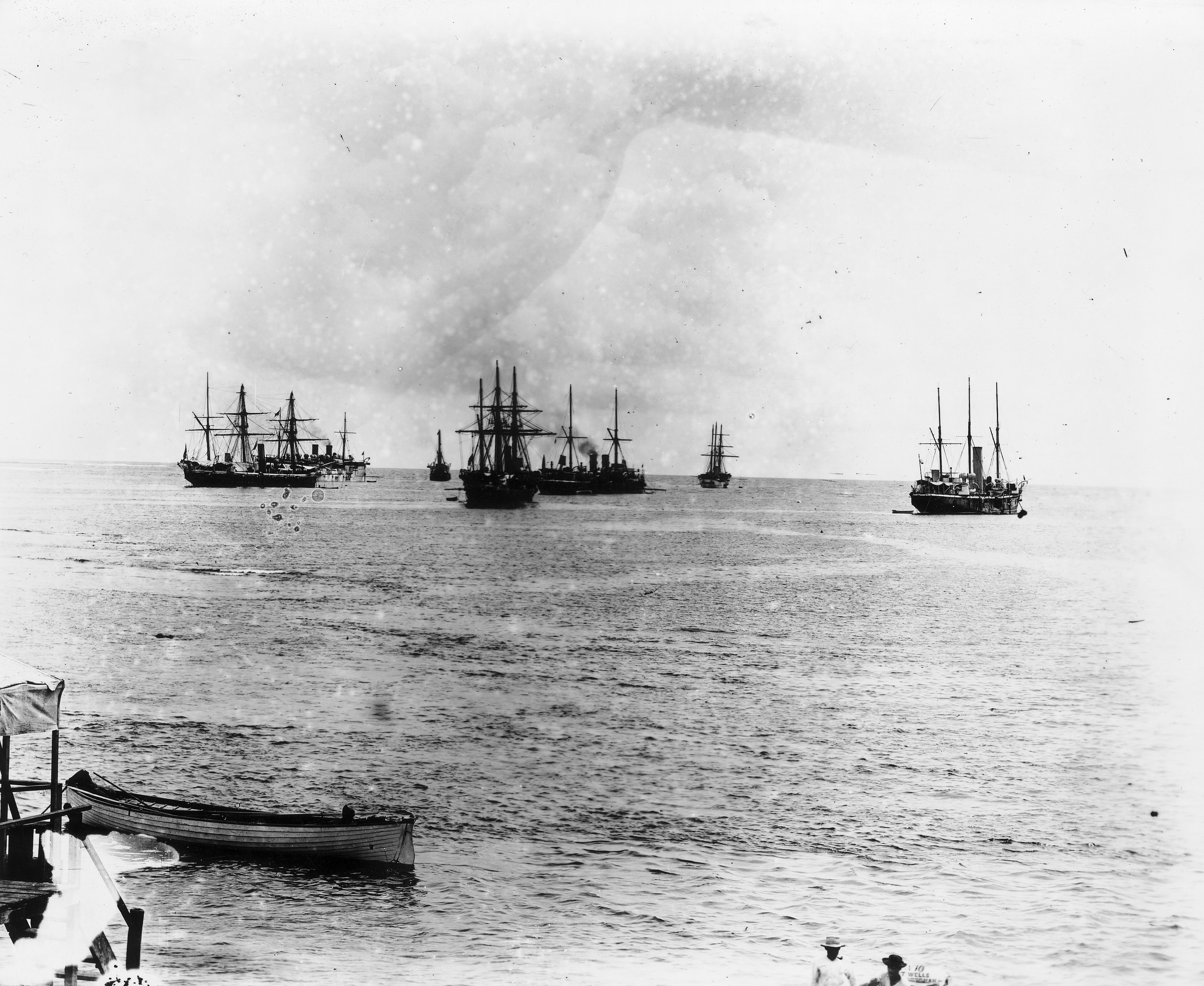
German, British and American warships in Apia Harbor, Samoa, 1899

Mission work in the Samoas had begun in late 1830 when John Williams of the London Missionary Society arrived from the Cook Islands and Tahiti. By the late nineteenth century, French, British, German, and American vessels routinely stopped at Samoa, as they valued Pago Pago Harbor as a refueling station for coal-fired shipping and whaling.

The United States Exploring Expedition visited the islands in 1839.

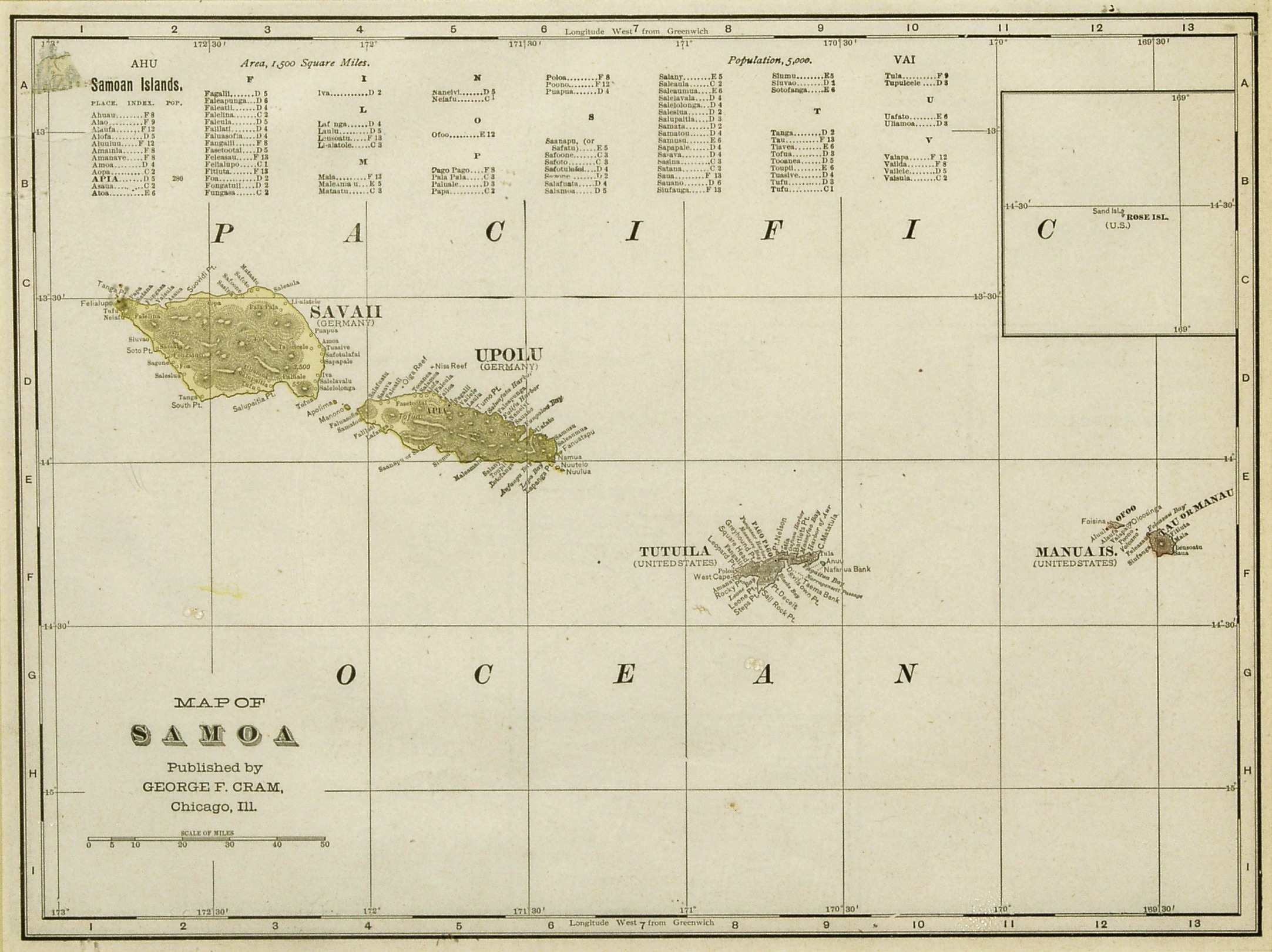
1896 map of the Samoa Islands

In 1872, Commander Richard W. Meade of the USS Narragansett sailed from Hawai'i to Pago Pago to explore the establishment of a U.S. naval station. At the request of Henry A. Peirce, the U.S. minister to Hawai'i, he was also tasked with negotiating a treaty that would secure American interests in Sāmoa. The Narragansett reached Pago Pago on February 14, and Meade informed High Chief Mauga of his intention to lease land for a naval base. Mauga granted the United States exclusive rights to build and maintain such a station in exchange for “the friendship and protection of the great government of the United States.” During his stay, Meade also arranged commercial port regulations for Pago Pago with Mauga.

In March 1889, an Imperial German naval force entered a village in Samoa, and in doing so destroyed some American property. Three American warships then entered the Apia harbor and prepared to engage the three German warships found there. Before any shots were fired, a typhoon wrecked both the American and German ships. A compulsory armistice was then called because of the lack of any warships.

=== 20th century ===
==== Early 20th century ====
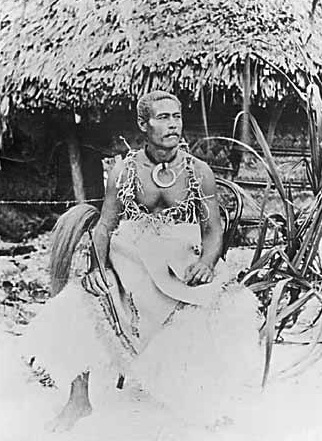
Tuimanuʻa Elisala Alalamua, the last official titleholder of Tui Manuʻa (1899–1909)

At the turn of the 20th century, international rivalries in the latter half of the century were settled by the 1899 Tripartite Convention in which Germany and the United States partitioned the Samoan Islands into two: the eastern island group became a territory of the United States (Tutuila in 1900 and officially Manuʻa in 1904) and is today known as American Samoa; the western islands, by far the greater landmass, became known as German Samoa, after Britain gave up all claims to Samoa and in return accepted the termination of German rights in Tonga and certain areas in the Solomon Islands and West Africa. Forerunners to the Tripartite Convention of 1899 were the Washington Conference of 1887, the Treaty of Berlin of 1889 and the Anglo-German Agreement on Samoa of 1899.

==== American colonization ====
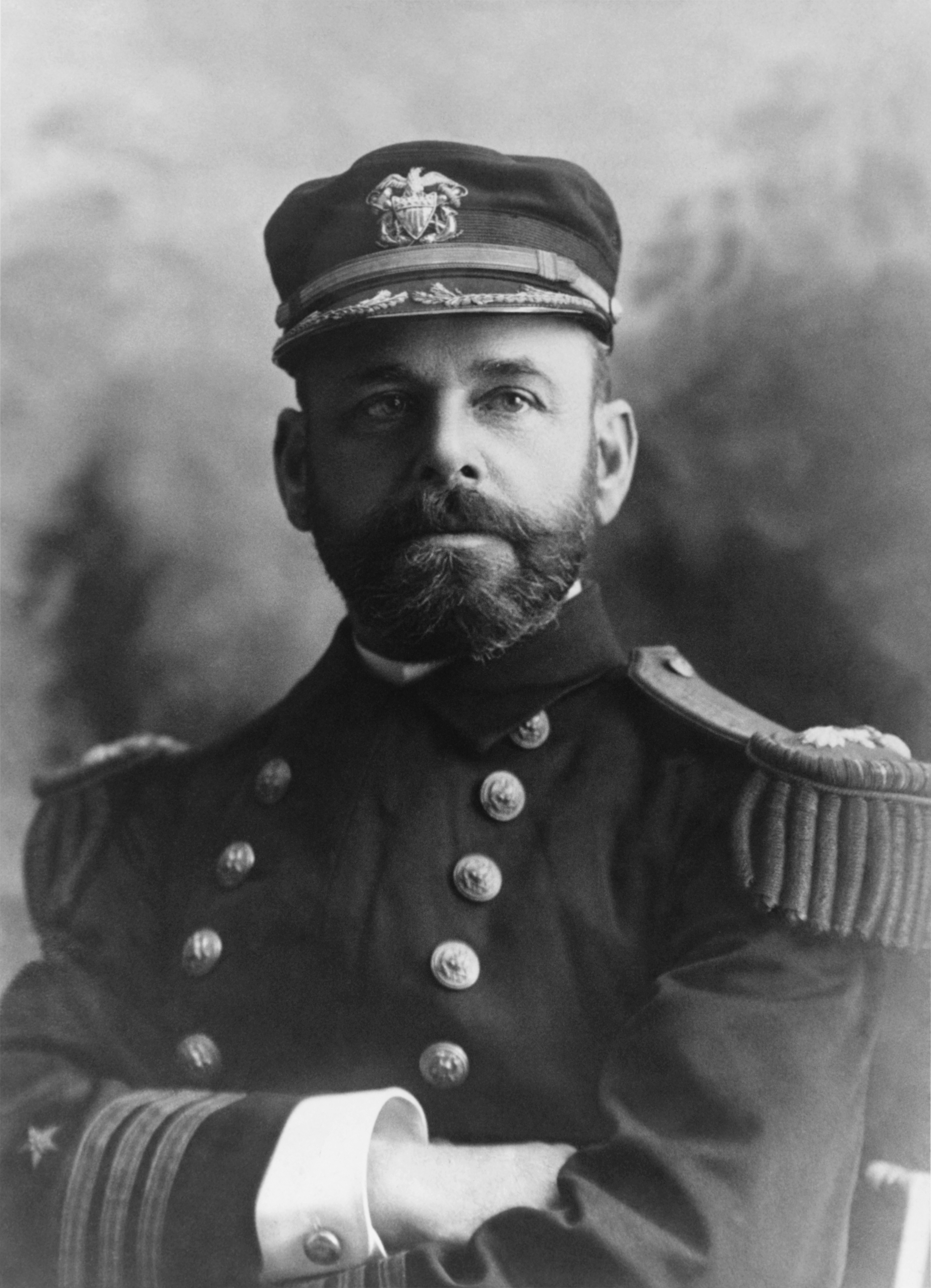
Rear Admiral Benjamin Franklin Tilley, the first Governor of American Samoa (1900–1901)

The following year, the U.S. formally annexed its portion, a smaller group of eastern islands, one of which contains the noted harbor of Pago Pago. After the United States Navy took possession of eastern Samoa for the United States government, the existing coaling station at Pago Pago Bay was expanded into a full naval station, known as United States Naval Station Tutuila and commanded by a commandant. The Navy secured a Deed of Cession of Tutuila in 1900 and a Deed of Cession of Manuʻa in 1904 on behalf of the U.S. government. The last sovereign of Manuʻa, the Tui Manuʻa Elisala, signed a Deed of Cession of Manuʻa following a series of U.S. naval trials, known as the "Trial of the Ipu", in Pago Pago, Taʻu, and aboard a Pacific Squadron gunboat. The territory became known as the U.S. Naval Station Tutuila.

On July 17, 1911, the U.S. Naval Station Tutuila, which was composed of Tutuila, Aunuʻu and Manuʻa, was officially renamed American Samoa. People of Manuʻa had been unhappy since they were left out of the name "Naval Station Tutuila". In May 1911, Governor William Michael Crose authored a letter to the Secretary of the Navy conveying the sentiments of Manuʻa. The department responded that the people should choose a name for their new territory. The traditional leaders chose "American Samoa", and, on July 7, 1911, the solicitor general of the Navy authorized the governor to proclaim it as the name for the new territory.

==== World War I and the 1918 influenza pandemic ====
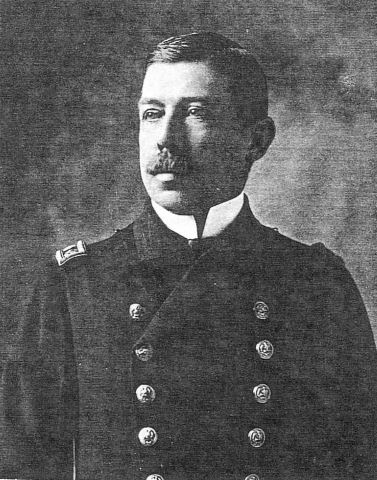
Commander John Martin Poyer served as the 12th Governor of American Samoa (1915–1919).

In 1918, during the final stages of World War I, the Great Influenza epidemic had taken its toll, spreading rapidly from country to country. American Samoa became one of the few places in the world (the others being New Caledonia and Marajó island in Brazil) to have proactively prevented any deaths during the pandemic through the quick response from Governor John Martin Poyer after hearing news reports of the outbreak on the radio and requesting quarantine ships from the U.S. mainland. The result of Poyer's quick actions earned him the Navy Cross from the U.S. Navy. With this distinction, American Samoans regarded Poyer as their hero for what he had done to prevent the deadly disease. The neighboring New Zealand territory at the time, Western Samoa, suffered the most of all Pacific islands, with 90% of the population infected; 30% of adult men, 22% of adult women and 10% of children died. Poyer offered assistance to help his New Zealand counterparts but was refused by the administrator of Western Samoa, Robert Logan, who became outraged after witnessing the number of quarantine ships surrounding American Samoa. Angered by this, Logan cut off communications with his American counterparts.

==== Interwar period ====
===== American Samoa Mau movement =====
After World War I, during the time of the Mau movement in Western Samoa (then a League of Nations mandate governed by New Zealand), there was a corresponding American Samoa Mau movement led by Samuelu Ripley, a World War I veteran who was from Leone village, Tutuila. After meetings on the United States mainland, he was prevented from disembarking from the ship that brought him home to American Samoa and was not allowed to return because the American Samoa Mau movement was suppressed by the U.S. Navy. In 1930 the U.S. Congress sent a committee to investigate the status of American Samoa, led by Americans who had a part in the overthrow of the Kingdom of Hawaii.

===== Annexation of Swains Island =====
Swains Island, which had been included in the list of guano islands appertaining to the United States and bonded under the Guano Islands Act, was annexed in 1925 by Pub. Res. 68–75, following the dissolution of the Gilbert and Ellice Islands Protectorate by the United Kingdom.

==== World War II and aftermath ====
During World War II, U.S. Marines stationed in Samoa outnumbered the local population and had a huge cultural influence. Young Samoan men from age 14 and above were combat-trained by U.S. military personnel. Samoans served in various capacities during World War II, including as combatants, medical personnel, code personnel, and ship repairmen.

In 1949, Organic Act 4500, a U.S. Department of Interior–sponsored attempt to incorporate American Samoa, was introduced in Congress. It was ultimately defeated, primarily through the efforts of Samoan chiefs, led by Tuiasosopo Mariota. The efforts of these chiefs led to the creation of a territorial legislature, the American Samoa Fono, which meets in the village of Fagatogo. In 1950 the Department of the Interior began to administer American Samoa.

==== 1951–1999 ====
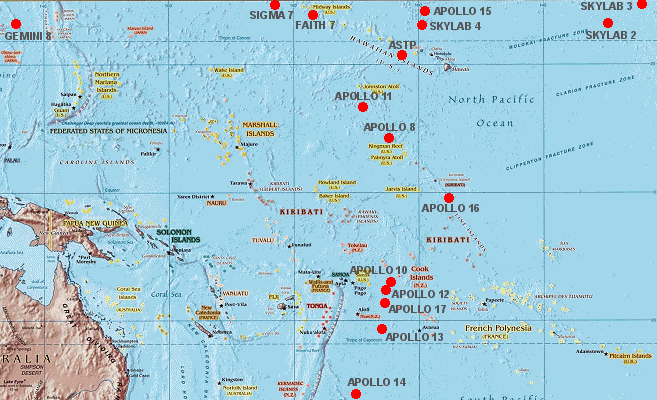
Locations of Pacific Ocean splashdowns of American spacecraft

By 1956, the U.S. Navy-appointed governor was replaced by Peter Tali Coleman, who was locally elected. Although technically considered "unorganized" since the U.S. Congress has not passed an Organic Act for the territory, American Samoa is self-governing under a constitution that became effective on July 1, 1967. The U.S. Territory of American Samoa is on the United Nations list of non-self-governing territories, a listing which is disputed by the territorial government officials, who do consider themselves to be self-governing.

American Samoa and Pago Pago International Airport had historic significance with the Apollo Program. The astronaut crews of Apollo 10, 12, 13, 14, and 17 were retrieved a few hundred miles from Pago Pago and transported by helicopter to the airport prior to being flown to Honolulu on C-141 Starlifter military aircraft.

While the two Samoas share language and ethnicity, their cultures have recently followed different paths, with American Samoans often emigrating to Hawaiʻi and the U.S. mainland and adopting many U.S. customs, such as the playing of American football and baseball. Samoans have tended to emigrate instead to New Zealand, whose influence has made the sports of rugby and cricket more popular in the western Samoan islands. Travel writer Paul Theroux noted that there were marked differences between the societies in Samoa and American Samoa.

On August 13, 1999, the United Nations granted American Samoa "observer seat" status. Six days later, American Samoa officially recognized both Samoan and English as its official languages.

=== 21st century ===
In 2001 and 2003, the United States unsuccessfully sought to have American Samoa removed from the United Nations' decolonization list, arguing that the territory should not be considered a colony.

American Samoans have a high rate of service in the U.S. Armed Forces. Because of economic hardship, military service has been seen as an opportunity in American Samoa and other U.S. Overseas territories.

The federal Fair Minimum Wage Act of 2007 started gradual adjustments to the territorial minimum wage to bring it up to the level for U.S. states.

== Notable events ==
=== Pre-20th century ===
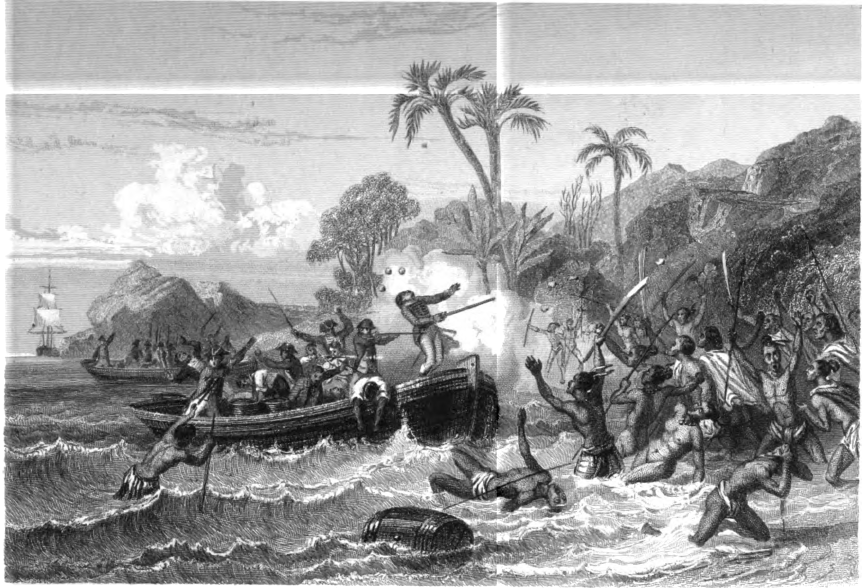
Death of Fleuriot de Langle in 1787

On December 13, 1784, French navigator Jean-François de Galaup, comte de Lapérouse landed two exploration parties on Tutuila's north shore: one from the ship Boussole at Fagasā, and the other from L'Astrolabe at Aʻasu. One of the cooks, David, died of "scorbutic dropsy". On December 11, twelve members of Lapérouse's crew (including First Officer Paul Antoine Fleuriot de Langle) were killed in a violent attack by Samoans at Aʻasu Bay, Tutuila, thereafter known as "Massacre Bay", which Lapérouse described as "this den, more fearful from its treacherous situation and the cruelty of its inhabitants than the lair of a lion or a tiger". This incident gave Samoa a reputation for savagery that kept Europeans away until the arrival of the first Christian missionaries four decades later. On December 12, at Aʻasu Bay, Lapérouse ordered his gunners to fire one cannonball amid the attackers who had killed his men the day before and were now returning to launch another attack. He later wrote in his journal "I could have destroyed or sunk a hundred canoes, with more than 500 people in them: but I was afraid of striking the wrong victims; the call of my conscience saved their lives."

=== 20th century ===
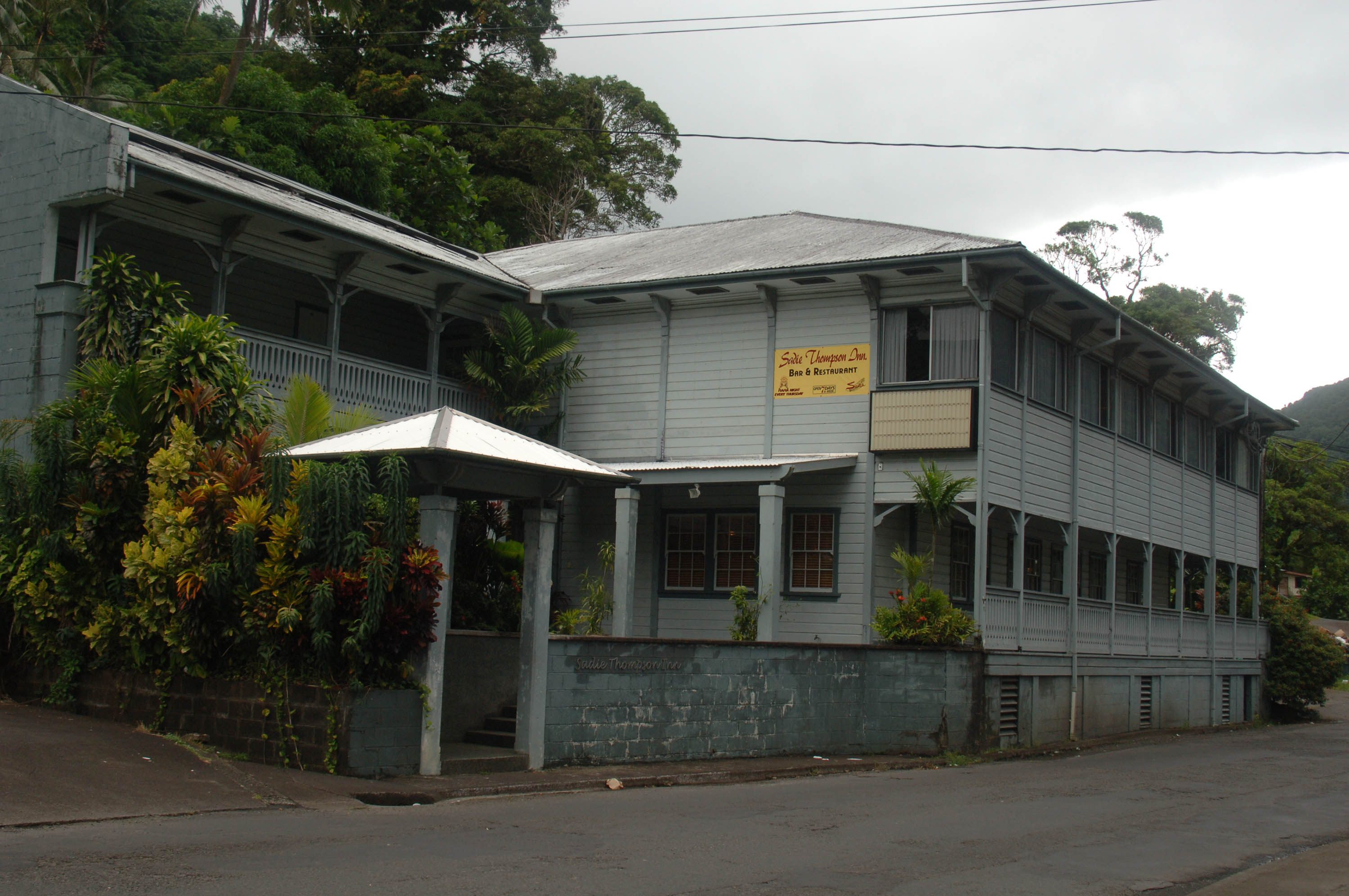
English author W. Somerset Maugham stayed at Sadie Thompson Inn during his six-week visit to Pago Pago in 1916.

On December 19, 1912, English writer William Somerset Maugham arrived in Pago Pago, allegedly accompanied by a missionary and Miss Sadie Thompson. His visit inspired his short story "Rain" which later became plays and three major motion pictures. The building still stands where Maugham stayed and has been renamed the Sadie Thompson Building. Today, it is a prominent restaurant and inn.

On November 2, 1921, American Samoa's 13th naval governor, Commander Warren Jay Terhune, died by suicide with a pistol in the bathroom of the government mansion, overlooking the entrance to Pago Pago Harbor. His body was discovered by Government House's cook, SDI First Class Felisiano Debid Ahchica, USN. His ghost is rumored to walk about the grounds at night.

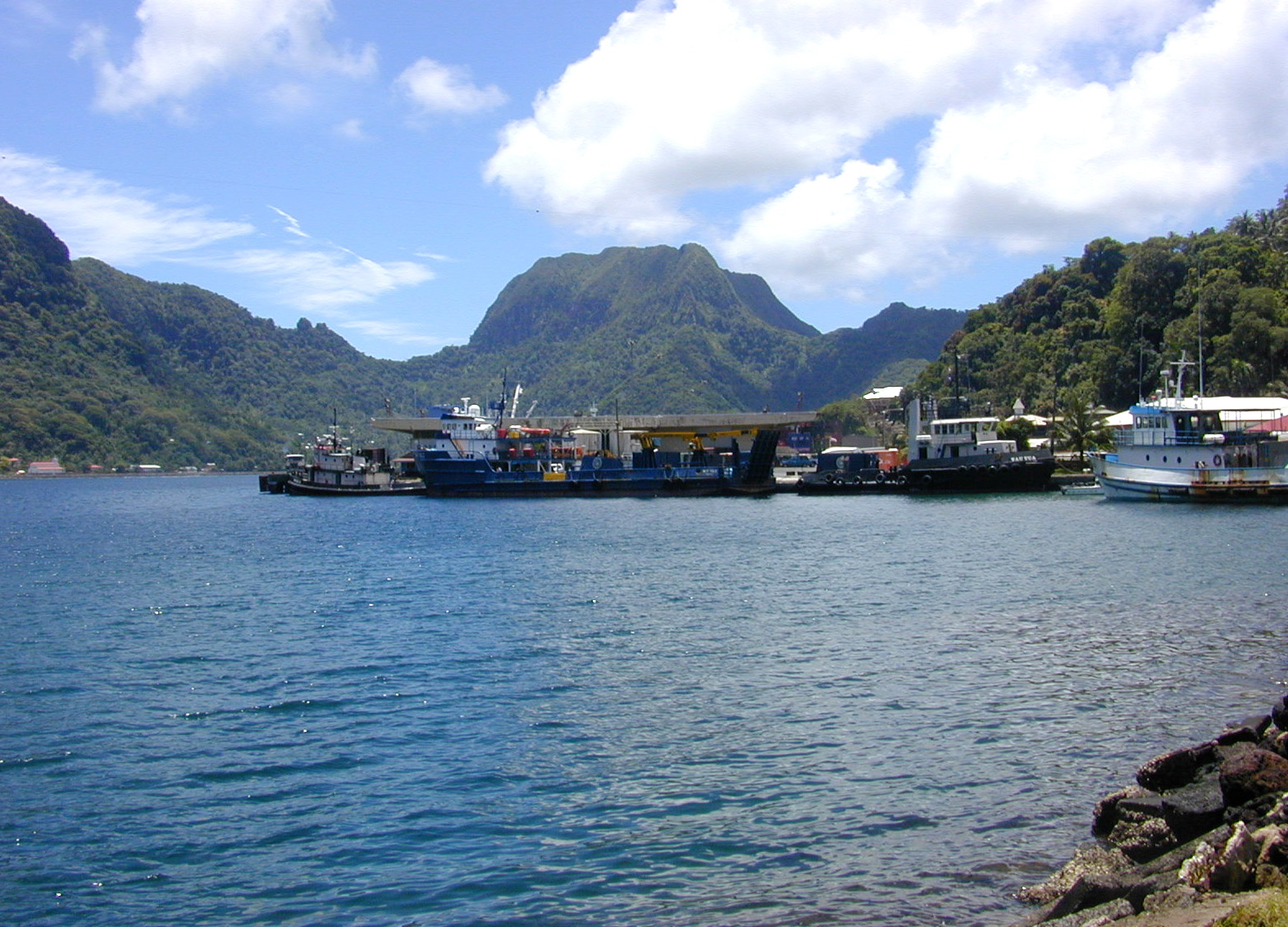
Pago Pago Harbor today and inter-island dock area

On August 17, 1924, Margaret Mead arrived in American Samoa aboard the SS Sonoma to begin fieldwork for her doctoral dissertation in anthropology at Columbia University, where she was a student of Professor Franz Boas. Her work Coming of Age in Samoa was published in 1928, at the time becoming the most widely read book in the field of anthropology. The book has sparked years of ongoing and intense debate and controversy. Mead returned to American Samoa in 1971 for the dedication of the Jean P. Haydon Museum.

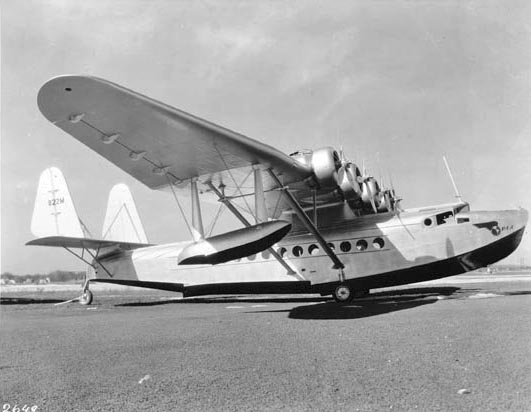
The Samoan Clipper

In 1938, the noted aviator Ed Musick and his crew died on the Pan American World Airways S-42 Samoan Clipper over Pago Pago, while on a survey flight to Auckland, New Zealand. Sometime after takeoff, the aircraft experienced trouble, and Musick turned it back toward Pago Pago. While the crew dumped fuel in preparation for an emergency landing, an explosion occurred that tore the aircraft apart.

On November 24, 1939, American Samoa's last execution to date was carried out. A man named Imoa of Fagatogo was convicted of stabbing a person named Sella to death and was hanged in the Customs House. The popular Samoan song "Faʻafofoga Samoa" is based on this, said to be the final words of Imoa.

On January 13, 1942, at 2:26 a.m., a Japanese submarine surfaced off Tutuila between Southworth Point and Fagasa Bay and fired about 15 shells from its 5.5-inch deck gun at the U.S. Naval Station Tutuila over the next 10 minutes. The first shell struck the rear of Frank Shimasaki's store, ironically owned by one of Tutuila's few Japanese residents. The store was closed, as Mr. Shimasaki had been interned as an enemy alien. The next shell caused slight damage to the naval dispensary, the third landed on the lawn behind the naval quarters known as "Centipede Row," and the fourth struck the stone seawall outside the customs house. The other rounds fell harmlessly into the harbor. As one writer described it, "The fire was not returned, notwithstanding the eagerness of the Samoan Marines to test their skill against the enemy ... No American or Samoan Marines were wounded." Commander Edwin B. Robinson was bicycling behind Centipede Row and was wounded in the knee by a piece of shrapnel, and "a member of the colorful native Fita Fita Guard" received minor injuries; they were the only casualties. This was the only time the Japanese attacked Tutuila during World War II, although "Japanese submarines had patrolled the waters around Samoa before the war, and continued to be active there throughout the war."

On August 24, 1943, First Lady Eleanor Roosevelt visited American Samoa and inspected the Fita Fita Guard and Band and the First Samoan Battalion of U.S. Marine Corps Reserve at the U.S. Naval Station American Samoa. The fact that First Lady reviewed the troops led to further assurance that Tutuila Island was considered safe. Her presence underscored that World War II had passed by American Samoa. While the Fita Fita band played, Eleanor Roosevelt inspected the guard.

On October 18, 1966, President Lyndon Baines Johnson and First Lady Lady Bird Johnson visited American Samoa. Mrs. Johnson dedicated the "Manulele Tausala" ("Lady Bird") Elementary School in Nuʻuuli, which was named after her. Johnson is the only US president to have visited American Samoa, while Mrs. Johnson was the second First Lady, preceded by Eleanor Roosevelt in 1943. The territory's only hospital was renamed the LBJ Tropical Medical Center in honor of President Johnson.

In the late 1960s and early 1970s, American Samoa played a pivotal role in five of the Apollo Program missions. The astronauts landed several hundred miles from Pago and were transported to the islands en route back to the mainland. President Richard Nixon gave three Moon rocks to the American Samoan government, which are currently on display in the Jean P. Haydon Museum along with a flag carried to the Moon on one of the missions.

In November 1970, Pope Paul VI visited American Samoa in a brief but lavish greeting.

On January 30, 1974, Pan Am Flight 806 from Auckland, New Zealand, crashed at Pago Pago International Airport at 10:41 pm, with 91 passengers aboard. 86 people were killed, including Captain Leroy A. Petersen and the entire flight crew. Four of the five surviving passengers were seriously injured, with the other only slightly injured. The airliner was destroyed by the impact and succeeding fire. The crash was attributed to poor visibility, pilot error, or wind shear since a violent storm was raging at the time. In January 2014, filmmaker Paul Crompton visited the territory to interview local residents for a documentary film about the 1974 crash.

As part of the Flag Day celebrations on April 17, 1980, a U.S. Navy P-3 Orion patrol plane from Patrol Squadron 50 took off with six skydivers from the U.S. Army's Hawaii-based Tropic Lightning Parachute Club. The airplane contacted the Solo Ridge-Mount Alava aerial tramway cable across Pago Pago harbor, which sheared off its vertical stabilizer. The aircraft crashed, demolishing a wing of the Rainmaker Hotel and killing all six crew members and one civilian. The six skydivers had already left the aircraft during a demonstration jump. A memorial monument is erected on Mt. Mauga O Aliʻi to honor their memory.

On November 1, 1988, President Ronald Reagan signed a bill which created American Samoa National Park.

=== 21st century ===
On July 22, 2010, Detective Lieutenant Lusila Brown was fatally shot outside the temporary High Court building in Fagatogo. It was the first time in more than 15 years that a police officer was killed in the line of duty. The last was Sa Fuimaono, who drowned after saving a teenager from rough seas.

On November 8, 2010, United States Secretary of State and former First Lady Hillary Clinton made a refueling stopover at the Pago Pago International Airport. She was greeted by government dignitaries and presented with gifts and a traditional kava ceremony.

Mike Pence was the third sitting U.S. vice president to visit American Samoa (after Dan Quayle and Joe Biden) when he made a stopover in Pago Pago in April 2017. He addressed 200 soldiers here during his refueling stop. U.S. Secretary of State Rex Tillerson visited town on June 3, 2017.

==== September 2009 earthquake and tsunami ====
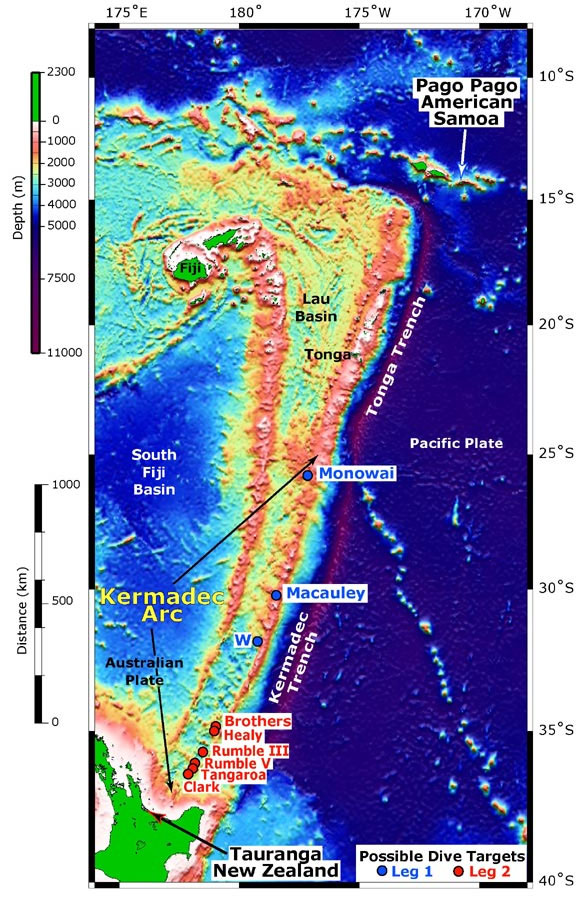
Tonga Trench south of the Samoa Islands and north of New Zealand

On September 28, 2009, at 17:48:11 UTC, an 8.1 magnitude earthquake struck 120 miles (190 km) off the coast of American Samoa, followed by smaller aftershocks. It was the largest earthquake of 2009. The quake occurred on the outer rise of the Kermadec-Tonga Subduction Zone. This is part of the Pacific Ring of Fire, where tectonic plates in the Earth's lithosphere meet, and earthquakes and volcanic activity are common. The quake struck 11.2 miles (18.0 km) below the ocean floor and generated an onsetting tsunami that killed more than 170 people in the Samoa Islands and Tonga. Four waves with heights from 15 feet (4.6 m) to 20 feet (6.1 m) high were reported to have reached up to one mile (1.6 km) inland on the island of Tutuila.

The Defense Logistics Agency worked with the Federal Emergency Management Agency to provide 16 ft × 16 ft (4.9 m × 4.9 m) humanitarian tents to the devastated areas of American Samoa.

== Government and politics ==
=== Government ===
American Samoa is classified in U.S. law as an unincorporated territory; the Ratification Act of 1929 vested all civil, judicial, and military powers in the President of the United States. In 1951, with Executive Order 10264, President Harry Truman delegated that authority to the Secretary of the Interior. On June 21, 1963 Paramount Chief Tuli Leʻiato of Fagaʻitua was sworn in and installed as the first Secretary of Samoan Affairs by Governor H. Rex Lee. On June 2, 1967, Interior Secretary Stewart Udall promulgated the Revised Constitution of American Samoa, which took effect on July 1, 1967.

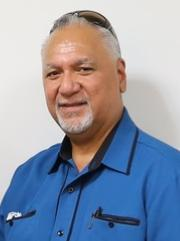
Pula Nikolao Pula, the 59th and incumbent Governor of American Samoa (2025–present)

The Governor of American Samoa is the head of government, and, along with the Lieutenant Governor of American Samoa, is elected on the same ticket by popular vote for a four-year term. The governor's office is located in Utulei. Since American Samoa is a U.S. territory, the President of the United States serves as the head of state but does not play a direct role in government. The Secretary of the Interior oversees the government, retaining the power to approve constitutional amendments, overrides the governor's vetoes, and nomination of justices.

The legislative power is vested in the American Samoa Fono, which has two chambers. The House of Representatives has 21 members serving two-year terms, being 20 representatives popularly elected from various districts and one delegate from Swains Island elected in a public meeting. The Senate has 18 members, elected for four-year terms by and from the chiefs of the islands. The Fono is located in Fagatogo.

The judiciary of American Samoa is composed of the High Court of American Samoa, a District Court, and village courts. The High Court and District Court are located in Fagatogo, near the Fono. The High Court is led by a Chief Justice and an Associate Justice, appointed by the Secretary of the Interior. Other judges are appointed by the governor upon the recommendation of the Chief Justice and confirmed by the Senate.

=== Politics ===
American Samoa is an unincorporated and unorganized territory of the United States, administered by the Office of Insular Affairs, U.S. Department of the Interior. American Samoa's constitution was ratified in 1966 and came into effect in 1967.

However, despite being de jure unorganized (as no Organic Act for it has been adopted by the U.S. Congress, instead leaving power vested in the U.S. president), American Samoa is de facto organized, with its politics taking place in the framework of a presidential representative democratic dependency (whereby an elected Governor is head of government) and of a pluriform multi-party system.

Executive power is exercised by the governor. Legislative power is vested in the two chambers of the legislature. The American political parties (Republican and Democratic) exist in American Samoa, but few politicians are aligned with the parties. The judiciary is independent of the executive and the legislature.

There is also the traditional village politics of the Samoa Islands, the "faʻamatai" and the "faʻa Sāmoa", which continues in American Samoa and independent Samoa, and which interacts across these current boundaries. The faʻa Sāmoa is the language and customs, and the faʻamatai are the protocols of the "fono" (council) and the chief system. The faʻamatai and the fono take place at all levels of the Samoan body politic, from the family to the village, to the region, to national matters.

The ʻaiga is the family unit of Samoan society, which differs from the Western sense of a family in that it consists of an "extended family" based on the culture's communal socio-political organization. The head of the ʻaiga is the matai. The matai (chiefs) are elected by consensus within the fono of the extended family and village(s) concerned. The matai and the fono, which are themselves made of matai, decide on the distribution of family exchanges and tenancy of communal lands. The majority of lands in American Samoa and independent Samoa are communal. A matai can represent a small family group or a great extended family that reaches across islands and to both American Samoa and independent Samoa.

In 2010, voters rejected a package of amendments to the territorial constitution, which would have, among other things, allowed U.S. citizens to be legislators only if they had Samoan ancestry.

In 2012, both the Governor and American Samoa's delegate to the U.S. Congress Eni Faleomavaega called for the populace to consider a move toward autonomy if not independence, with a mixed response.

==== Nationality ====
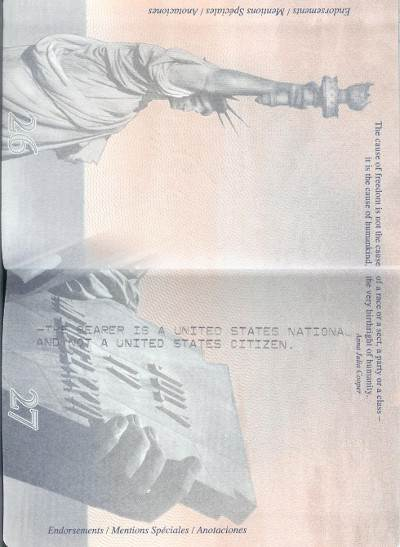
Message in the passport of an American Samoan stating that the passport holder is a national, not citizen, of the U.S

According to the Immigration and Nationality Act (INA), the people born in American Samoa – including those born on Swains Island – are "nationals but not citizens of the United States at birth". If a child is born on any of these islands to any U.S. citizen, then that child is considered a national and a citizen of the United States at birth. All U.S. nationals have statutory rights to reside in all parts of the United States, and may apply for citizenship by naturalization after three months of residency by paying a fee, passing a test in English and civics, and taking an oath of allegiance to the United States. All U.S. nationals also have the right to work in the United States, except in certain government jobs that specifically require U.S. citizenship.

The question of whether American Samoans should be granted citizenship is controversial in American Samoa, and the government of American Samoa is currently opposed to it. Those against citizenship worry that it would lead to federal judges overturning American Samoa's unique political system and land ownership customs, in which one must be at least 50% of Samoan ancestry to acquire land and land ownership is controlled by local families and matai. Those in favor of citizenship claim the law discriminates against them unfairly, restricting their voting rights and their ability to serve in many public sector professions.

In 2012, a group of American Samoans sued the federal government seeking recognition of birthright citizenship for American Samoans in the case Tuaua v. United States. In an amicus curiae brief filed in federal court, American Samoan Congressman Faleomavaega supported the legal interpretation that the Citizenship Clause of the Fourteenth Amendment does not extend birthright citizenship to United States nationals born in unincorporated territories. In June 2015, the U.S. Court of Appeals for the District of Columbia affirmed that Fourteenth Amendment citizenship guarantees did not apply to persons born in unincorporated territories and a year later the U.S. Supreme Court declined to review the lower court's decision.

In December 2019, U.S. District Judge Clark Waddoups struck down 8 U.S.C. § 1408(1) as facially unconstitutional, holding that "Persons born in American Samoa are citizens of the United States by the Citizenship Clause of the Fourteenth Amendment", but the United States Court of Appeals for the Tenth Circuit reversed the district court's judgment and found the statute constitutional. On July 20, 2021, the Legislature of American Samoa unanimously passed a resolution in support of the 10th Circuit Court's decision to reverse.

==== Voting rights ====
As U.S. nationals, American Samoans can vote in local elections in the territory; however, if they live in other parts of the United States, they are not allowed to vote in federal, state or the vast majority of local elections unless they become U.S. citizens. The only federal office American Samoans elect directly is a non-voting delegate to the United States House of Representatives. Since the delegate's office was created in 1978, three people have held the seat: Democrat Fofō Iosefa Fiti Sunia (1981–1988); Democrat Eni Faleomavaega (1989–2015); and Republican Aumua Amata Radewagen (2015–). American Samoans also participate in partisan presidential primaries, as well as send delegates to the Democratic and Republican National Conventions.

==== Immigration ====
Unique among U.S. territories, American Samoa has its own immigration law, separate from the laws that apply in other parts of the United States. U.S. nationals may freely reside in American Samoa. (Note: To travel to American Samoa, U.S. nationals need to show proof of existing residence or future employment in American Samoa, or a ticket for future departure from the territory. However, once there, U.S. nationals may reside indefinitely and cannot be deported.) The American Samoan government, via its Immigration Office, controls the migration of foreign nationals to the islands. Special application forms exist for migration to American Samoa based on family or employment sponsorship.

Unlike all other permanently inhabited U.S. jurisdictions (states, District of Columbia, Puerto Rico, U.S. Virgin Islands, Guam and Northern Mariana Islands), American Samoa is not considered a U.S. state for the purposes of the U.S. Immigration and Nationality Act. As a result, there is no path for immigrants to American Samoa to apply for U.S. citizenship, or U.S. nationality at all, without permanent residence in another U.S. jurisdiction. In addition, foreign nationals who do have lawful permanent residence in the United States may be considered to have abandoned it if they have moved to live in American Samoa, and time spent there does not count in the required period of U.S. presence for naturalization.

U.S. nationals without U.S. citizenship (the status of most American Samoans) have the right to reside in all parts of the United States without immigration restrictions. They also have the same rights as lawful permanent residents to sponsor foreign family members to immigrate to the United States (they may sponsor spouses and unmarried children), but not the same rights as U.S. citizens (who may also sponsor parents, married children, and siblings).

==== Land ownership ====
Under American Samoan law, land ownership is subject to racial restrictions. Since 1900, there have been three main categories of land ownership: native, individual, and freehold. Native land, which makes up over 90% of all land in the territory, is land under the communal ownership of an ʻaiga, as opposed to the private ownership of an individual. Freehold land, which makes up only about 2% of the total, is land which was granted to foreigners before the U.S. took possession of the territory in 1900 and whose owners have not chosen to revert to native or individual land status.

The American Samoa Code (Annotated) prohibits the transfer of ownership (whether by sale or otherwise) of any land other than freehold land to any person who has less than one-half native Samoan blood, which in this context includes both American and Western Samoa. In addition, it is prohibited to transfer ownership of any native (communal) land to any person who is not a full-blooded native Samoan: this includes any person who has any non-native blood whatsoever, even if they are more than one-half native Samoan.

In Craddick v. Territorial Registrar, 1 Am. Samoa 2d. 10, 14 (1980), the Appellate Division of the High Court of American Samoa held that while these laws created a classification based on race, they did not violate the guarantees of equal protection and due process contained in the U.S. Constitution and the Revised American Samoan Constitution. Given the cruciality of land ownership and the communal ownership structure to American Samoan culture, and the American Samoan government's vital and demonstrated interest in preserving Samoan land and culture, the Court found that the laws in question pursued a proper purpose rather than a discriminatory one, and, being necessary to achieve that purpose, were sufficiently justified and thus constitutional.

==== Official protest to naming of neighboring Samoa ====
The U.S. Embassy in Samoa notes that: "In July 1997 the Constitution was amended to change the country's name from Western Samoa to Samoa. Samoa had been known simply as Samoa in the United Nations since joining the organization in 1976. The neighboring U.S. territory of American Samoa protested the move, feeling that the change diminished its own Samoan identity. American Samoans still use the terms Western Samoa and Western Samoans."

=== Administrative divisions ===
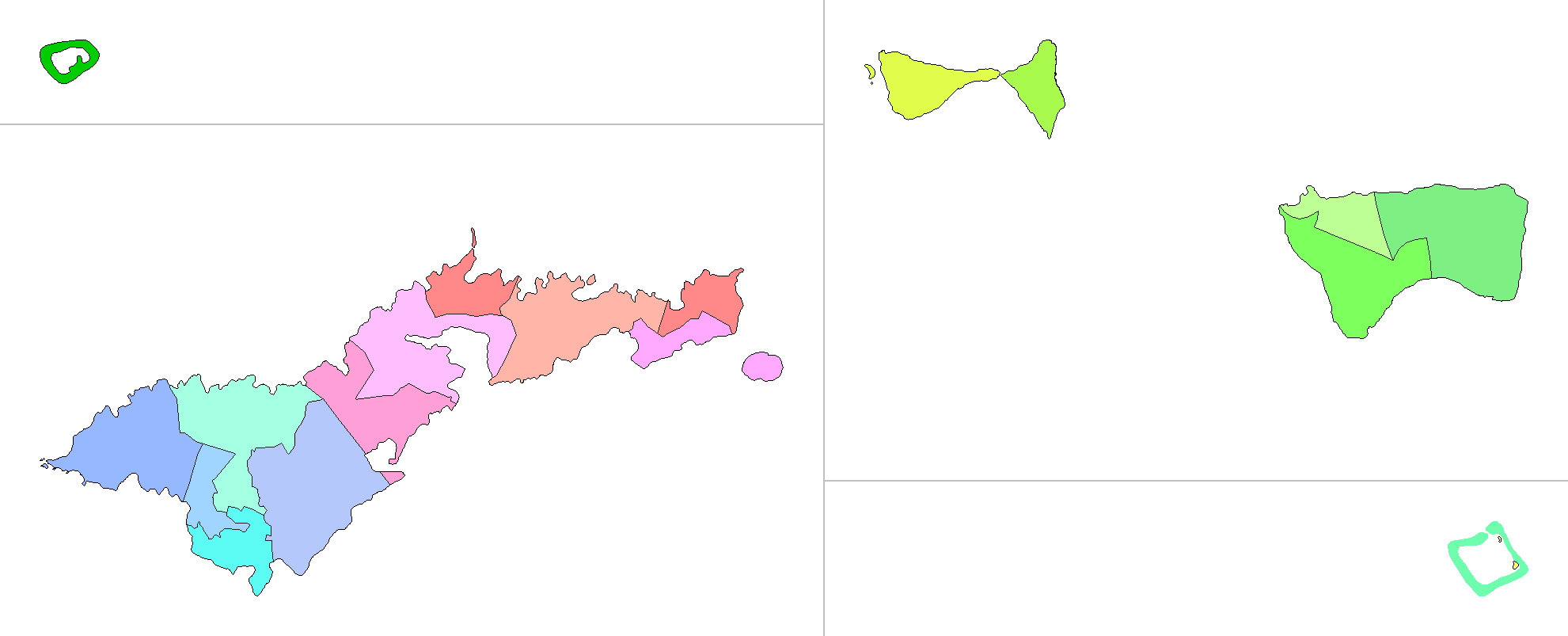
- Islands, atolls, districts and counties of American Samoa (Note: An American Samoan law of 1962 defined 14 counties. The constitution of 1967, signed by delegates from these 14 counties, established 15 counties from then on, separating Fofo from Lealataua. The election law was later revised accordingly. However, the U.S. Census Bureau continues to list 14 counties, treating Fofo as part of Lealataua.)

American Samoa is administratively divided into three districts – Western, Eastern and Manuʻa – and two "unorganized" atolls, Swains Island and the uninhabited Rose Atoll. The districts are subdivided into counties and villages. Pago Pago, often cited as the capital of American Samoa, is one of the largest villages and is located on the central part of Tutuila island in Maʻoputasi County.

== Geography ==
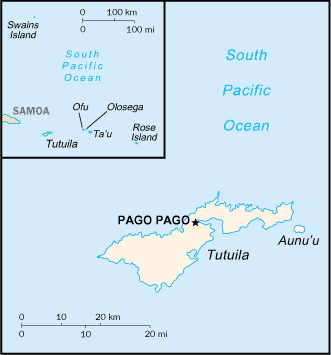
Map of American Samoa

American Samoa, located within the geographical region of Oceania, is one of only two possessions of the United States in the Southern Hemisphere, the other being Jarvis Island. Its total land area is 76.1 square miles (197.1 km^{2}) – slightly larger than Washington, D.C. – consisting of five rugged, volcanic islands and two coral atolls.

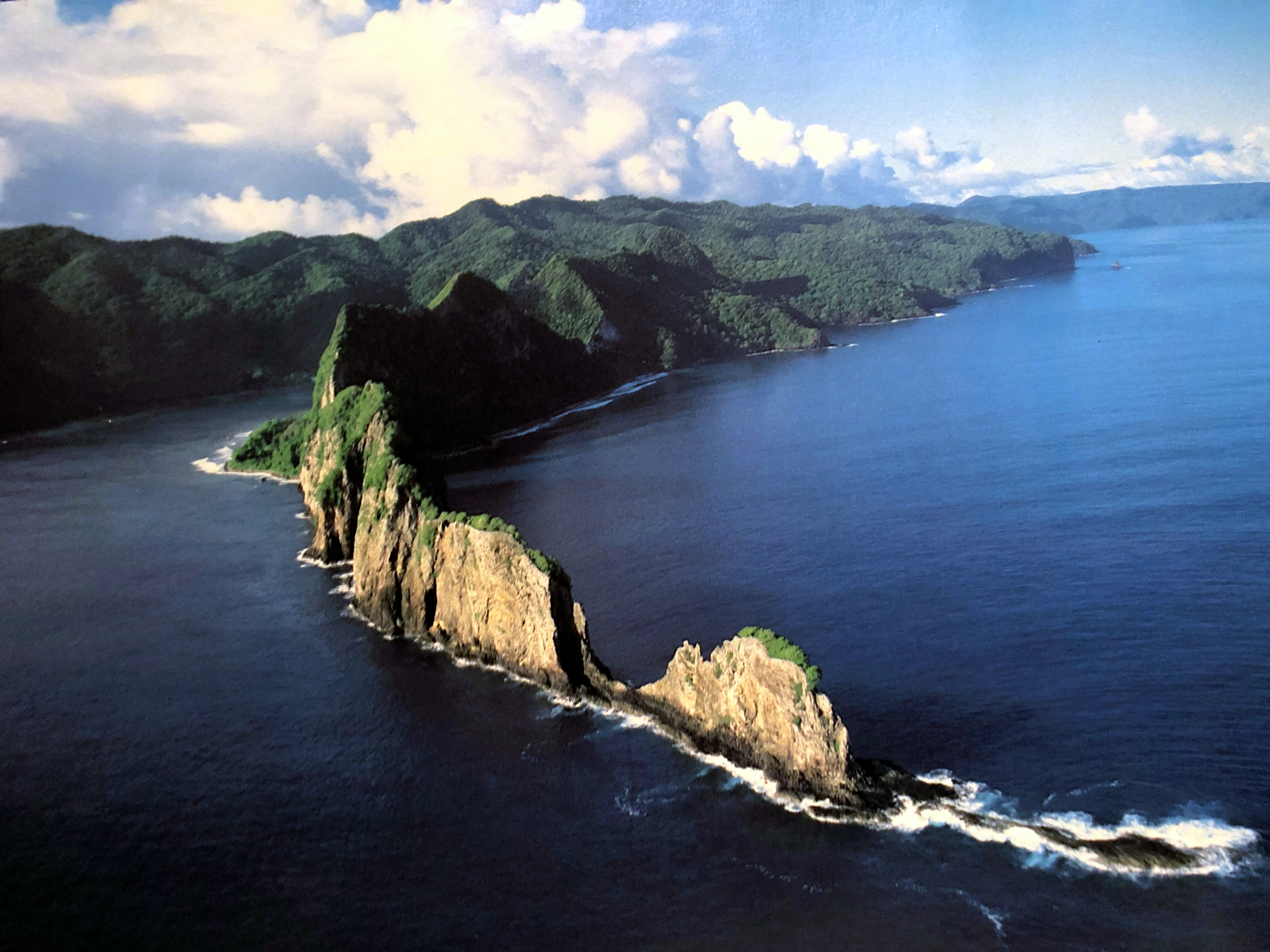
Cockscomb Point on Pola Island is seen jutting into the ocean.

The five volcanic islands are Tutuila, Aunuʻu, Ofu, Olosega, and Taʻū. The coral atolls are Swains and Rose Atoll. Of the seven islands, Rose Atoll is the only uninhabited one; it is a Marine National Monument. American Samoa is the southernmost reach of the United States at fourteen degrees below the equator.

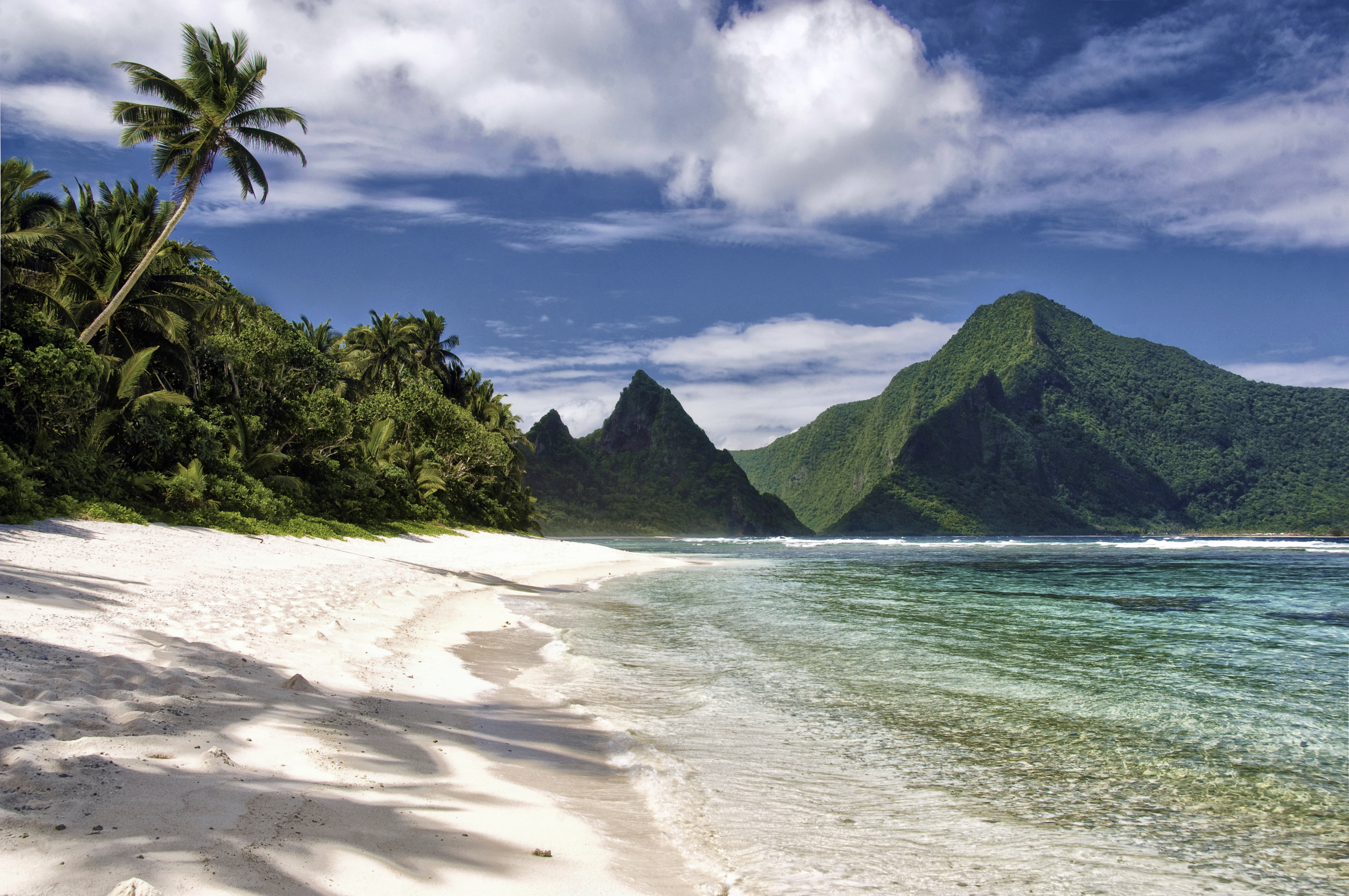
A view of American Samoa's Ofu Beach on Ofu Island in the Manuʻa Islands

Due to its positioning in the South Pacific Ocean, it is frequently hit by tropical cyclones between November and April. Rose Atoll is the easternmost point of the territory. American Samoa's Rose Atoll is the southernmost point of the United States. American Samoa is home to the National Park of American Samoa.

The highest mountains are: Lata Mountain (Taʻū), 3,170 ft (970 m); Matafao Peak, 2,141 ft (653 m); Piumafua (Olosega), 2,095 ft (639 m); and Tumutumu (Ofu), 1,621 ft (494 m). Mount Pioa, nicknamed the Rainmaker, is 1,718 ft (524 m). American Samoa is also home to some of the world's highest sea cliffs at 3,000 ft (910 m).

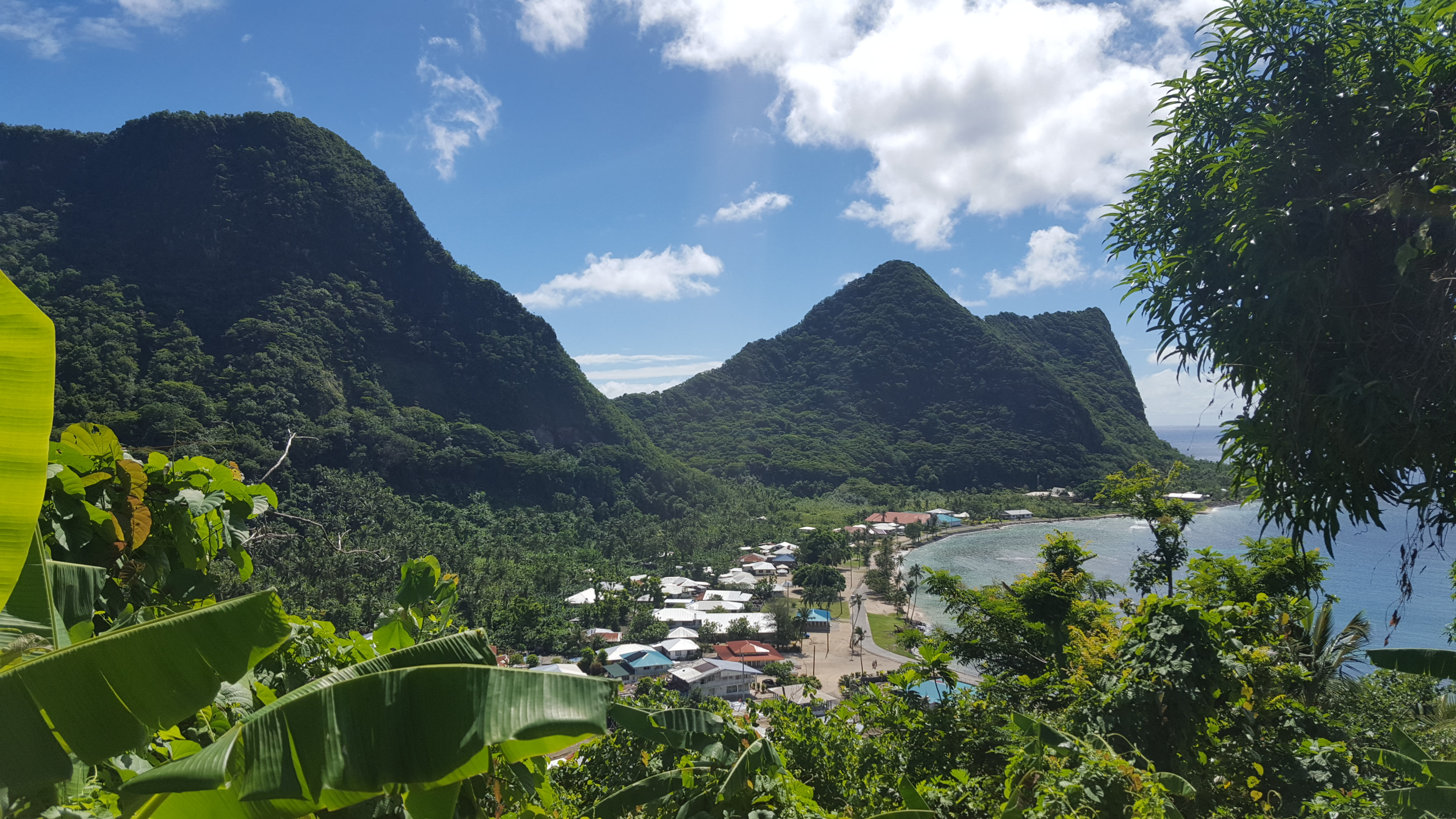
Coastline of American Samoa (in Vatia)

The Vailuluʻu seamount, an active submerged volcano, lies 28 miles (45 km) east of Taʻū in American Samoa. It was discovered in 1975 and has since been studied by an international team of scientists, contributing towards understanding of the Earth's fundamental processes. Growing inside the summit crater of Vailuluʻu is an active underwater volcanic cone, named after Samoa's goddess of war, Nafanua.

In American Samoa forest cover is around 86% of the total land area, equivalent to 17,130 hectares (ha) of forest in 2020, down from 18,070 hectares (ha) in 1990. In 2020, naturally regenerating forest covered 17,130 hectares (ha) and planted forest covered 0 hectares (ha). Of the naturally regenerating forest 1% was reported to be primary forest (consisting of native tree species with no clearly visible indications of human activity) and around 15% of the forest area was found within protected areas. For the year 2015, 0% of the forest area was reported to be under public ownership, 100% private ownership and 0% with ownership listed as other or unknown.

American Samoa lies within two terrestrial ecoregions: Samoan tropical moist forests and Western Polynesian tropical moist forests.

== Climate ==
Climate chart for Pago Pago

American Samoa has a tropical rainforest climate (Af) all year round with two distinct seasons, the wet and dry season. The wet season is usually between December and March and the dry season is from April through to September with the average daily temperature around 81–83 °F (27–28 °C) all year round.

The climate is warm, tropical, and humid, averaging around 80 °F or 26.7 °C, with a variation of about 15 °F or 8 °C during the year. The southern hemisphere winter, from June to September, is the coolest time of the year. The summer months of December to March bring hotter temperatures, while the months from April to November are considered the "dry" season. Throughout the year, however, rain follows clouds blown in by the trade winds that rise from the east almost daily. The mountains of the Pago Pago area, standing over Pago Pago Harbor, catch these clouds, bringing an average of 200 inches or 5,100 millimeters of rainfall per year.

Climate data for Pago Pago International Airport, Pago Pago (1991–2020 normals, extremes 1957–present)
Month	Jan	Feb	Mar	Apr	May	Jun	Jul	Aug	Sep	Oct	Nov	Dec	Year
Record high °F (°C)	95 (35)	99 (37)	95 (35)	95 (35)	93 (34)	95 (35)	91 (33)	92 (33)	92 (33)	94 (34)	95 (35)	94 (34)	99 (37)
Mean maximum °F (°C)	91.0 (32.8)	91.3 (32.9)	91.3 (32.9)	90.7 (32.6)	89.6 (32.0)	88.0 (31.1)	87.7 (30.9)	88.0 (31.1)	88.9 (31.6)	89.6 (32.0)	90.4 (32.4)	90.7 (32.6)	92.4 (33.6)
Mean daily maximum °F (°C)	87.8 (31.0)	88.1 (31.2)	88.4 (31.3)	87.8 (31.0)	86.5 (30.3)	85.3 (29.6)	84.6 (29.2)	84.8 (29.3)	85.7 (29.8)	86.4 (30.2)	87.0 (30.6)	87.6 (30.9)	86.7 (30.4)
Daily mean °F (°C)	83.0 (28.3)	83.2 (28.4)	83.3 (28.5)	83.0 (28.3)	82.2 (27.9)	81.5 (27.5)	80.9 (27.2)	80.9 (27.2)	81.6 (27.6)	82.1 (27.8)	82.5 (28.1)	82.9 (28.3)	82.3 (27.9)
Mean daily minimum °F (°C)	78.2 (25.7)	78.3 (25.7)	78.2 (25.7)	78.1 (25.6)	77.9 (25.5)	77.8 (25.4)	77.2 (25.1)	77.0 (25.0)	77.5 (25.3)	77.7 (25.4)	78.0 (25.6)	78.2 (25.7)	77.8 (25.4)
Mean minimum °F (°C)	75.1 (23.9)	75.2 (24.0)	75.0 (23.9)	74.7 (23.7)	73.6 (23.1)	73.4 (23.0)	72.4 (22.4)	72.6 (22.6)	73.3 (22.9)	73.7 (23.2)	73.9 (23.3)	74.7 (23.7)	70.7 (21.5)
Record low °F (°C)	67 (19)	65 (18)	63 (17)	68 (20)	65 (18)	61 (16)	62 (17)	60 (16)	62 (17)	59 (15)	60 (16)	65 (18)	59 (15)
Average precipitation inches (mm)	15.25 (387)	13.70 (348)	10.95 (278)	11.27 (286)	11.73 (298)	6.37 (162)	7.51 (191)	6.93 (176)	7.99 (203)	10.24 (260)	12.05 (306)	14.35 (364)	128.34 (3,260)
Average precipitation days (≥ 0.01 in)	24.3	22.0	23.8	22.2	20.8	18.8	20.0	19.0	18.4	21.1	21.3	23.8	255.5
Average relative humidity (%)	82.8	83.3	83.2	84.0	83.6	82.0	80.4	79.8	80.2	81.5	82.3	82.1	82.1
Mean monthly sunshine hours	165.3	150.3	179.2	132.2	123.3	113.7	148.0	168.0	196.0	159.6	156.7	156.8	1,849.1
Percentage possible sunshine	41	43	48	37	35	34	42	47	54	41	41	39	42
Source: NOAA (relative humidity and sun 1961–1990)

=== Climate change ===
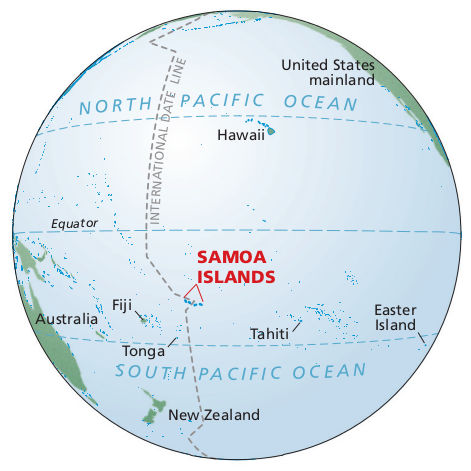
Locations of the Samoan Islands, including American Samoa.

Climate change in American Samoa encompasses the effects of climate change, attributed to man-made increases in atmospheric carbon dioxide, in the U.S. territory of American Samoa. The American Samoa Environmental Protection Agency (ASEPA) notes that the territory "has a fragile ecosystem" which is "directly and immediately impacted by global climate change".

The Human Rights Measurement Initiative finds that the climate crisis has worsened human rights conditions in American Samoa slightly (2.3 out of 6). Human rights experts provided that the climate crisis has affected shores, fishers and resource availability, and that only a small group of people are able to connect the climate crisis with existing human rights conditions.

== Economy ==
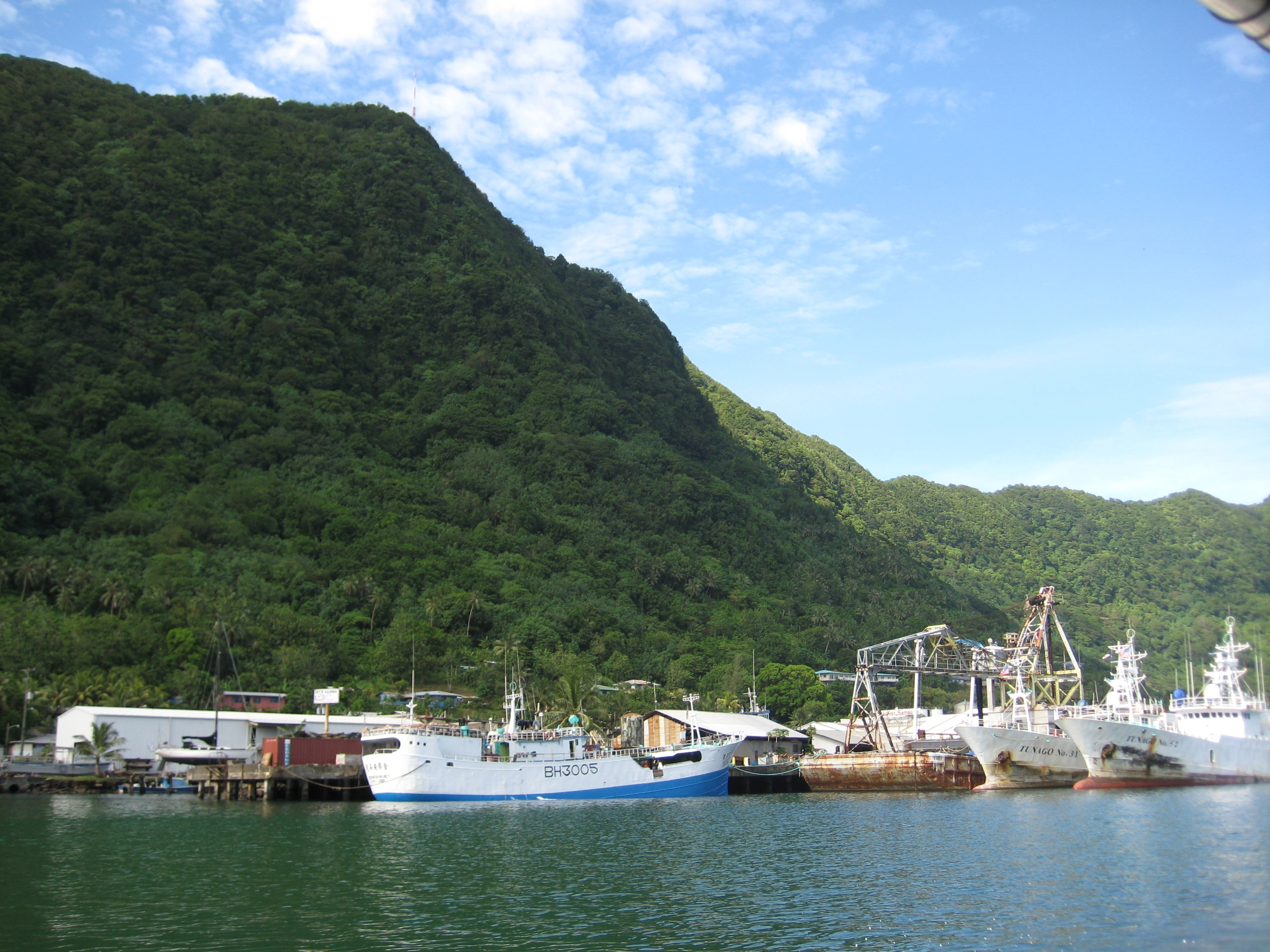
Tuna boats in the port of Pago Pago

The economic health of American Samoa reflects the trends in other populated U.S. territories, which are in turn dependent on federal appropriations. Federal dollars enter the economy through congressional appropriations, categorical grants, Social Security payments, and payments to Samoans retired from the military. Tuna canning is the backbone of the American Samoa economy. Cannery employment and local auxiliary businesses provide additional revenues for the territorial government. In the mid-1960s, efforts began to develop a tourism industry in American Samoa. Efforts were delayed due to issues with inconsistent airline service, insufficient high-quality accommodations, and the lack of well-trained workers in the hospitality and tourism industries. Agriculture and fishing still provide sustenance for local families.

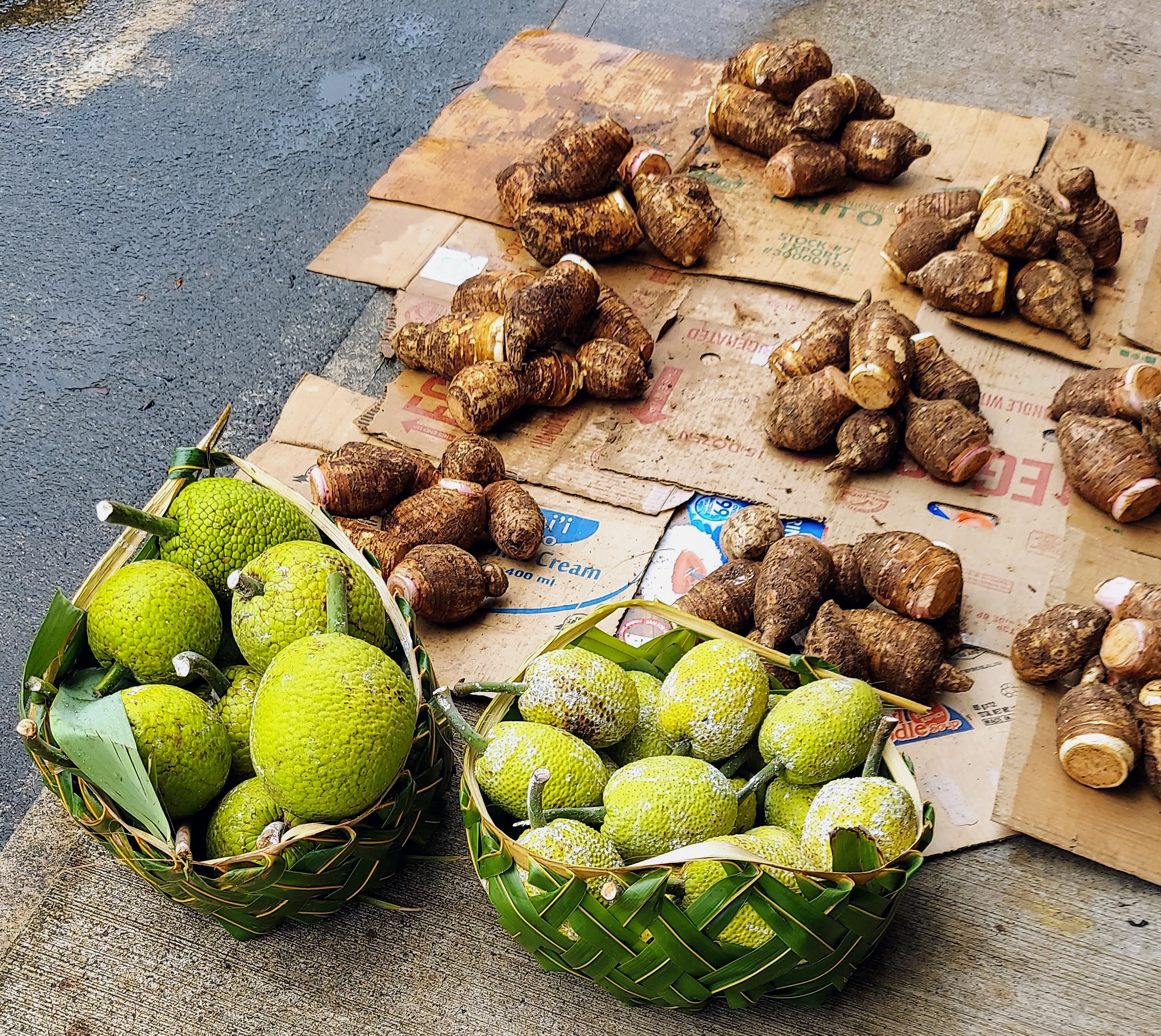
Breadfruit and taro from Pago Pago

Employment on the island falls into three relatively equal-sized categories of approximately 5,000 workers each: the public sector, the single remaining tuna cannery, and the rest of the private sector.

There are only a few federal employees in American Samoa and a few active duty military personnel, except members of the U.S. Coast Guard, military recruiters, and some Full-Time Support staff at the Pele Army Reserve unit that maintains the facility and provides cadre, training, and logistics support. The Pele US Army Reserve Center is in Tafuna, and a U.S. Army and United States Marine Corps recruiting station is in Nuʻuuli.

There are six Army Reserve units at Pele:

- Bravo Company, 100th Battalion, 442nd Infantry
- Charlie Company, 100th Battalion, 442nd Infantry
- 411th Forward Support Company (Engineer)
- USAR Theater Support Group Detachment American Samoa
- 1st Evacuation/Mortuary Platoon, 2nd Platoon, 962nd Quartermaster Company
- 127th Chaplain Detachment

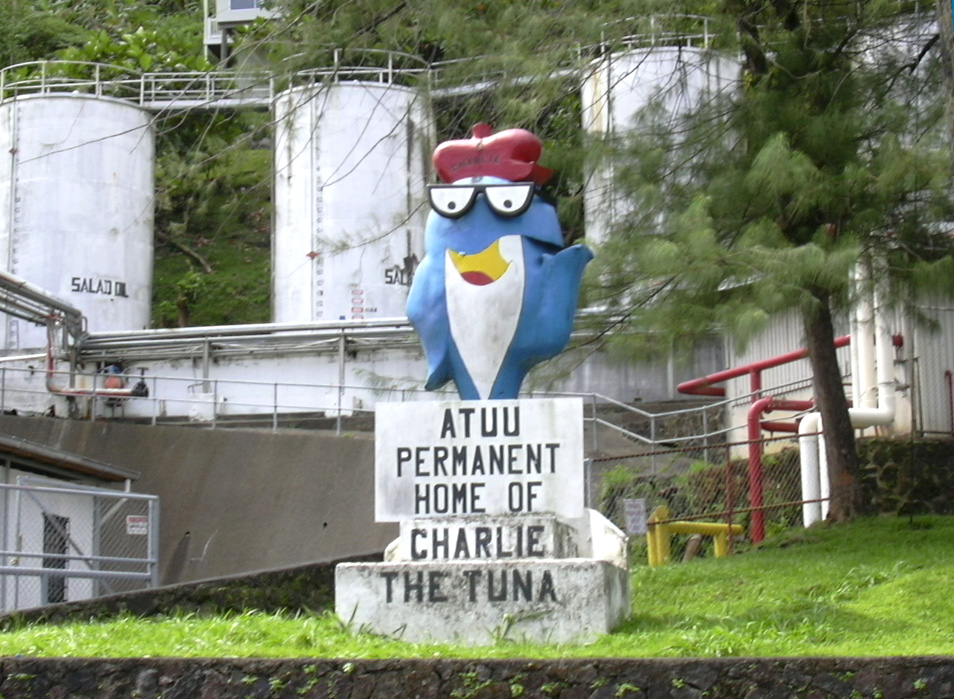
Mascot "Charlie the Tuna" at the StarKist cannery in Atuʻu

The overwhelming majority of public sector employees work for the American Samoa territorial government. One tuna cannery is StarKist, which exports several hundred million dollars' worth of canned tuna to the United States each year. In early 2007, the Samoan economy was highlighted in the Congress at the request of Eni Faleomavaega, the Samoan delegate to the United States House of Representatives, as it was not mentioned in the minimum wage bill. It was given no exemption from the coming increases, which he protested as unfair to the Samoan economy. House Speaker Nancy Pelosi initially granted his request for an exemption, but backed down after being accused of serving special interests, since tuna packing company Chicken of the Sea was based in her district. Samoa Packing, a Chicken of the Sea subsidiary closed in 2009, citing both minimum wage increases and increasing foreign competition, with the latter as the "main reason". Minimum wage in Samoa has been the topic of much debate, with the Samoan government and Chamber of Commerce strongly opposed, while businesses and workers hold nuanced views.

=== GDP ===
From 2002 to 2007, real GDP of American Samoa increased at an average annual rate of 0.4 percent. The annual growth rates of real GDP ranged from −2.9 percent to +2.1 percent. The volatility in the growth rates of real GDP was primarily accounted for by changes in the exports of canned tuna. The tuna canning industry was the largest private employer in American Samoa during this period. In 2017, GDP in American Samoa decreased by 5.8%, but in 2018 it increased by 2.2%.

Summary statistics for American Samoa
	2002	2003	2004	2005	2006	2007	2002–2007 AAGR^{A}
GDP^{B}	536	527	553	550	548	532	−0.1%
Real GDP^{C}	527	535	539	550	534	537	0.4%
Population^{D}	60,800	62,600	64,100	65,500	66,900	68,200	2.3%
Real GDP per capita	8,668	8,546	8,409	8,397	7,982	7,874	−1.9%

- ^{A} Average annual growth rate.
- ^{B} In millions of dollars.
- ^{C} In millions of 2005 chained dollars.
- ^{D} Source: 2008 American Samoa Statistical Yearbook.

From 2002 to 2007, the population of American Samoa increased at an average annual rate of 2.3 percent, and real GDP per capita decreased at an average annual rate of 1.9 percent.

=== Employment ===
Agricultural production covers for domestic needs and only a small share of fruits and vegetables are exported. According to figures as of 2013, the ratio between import and export is almost balanced. Many residents rely on transfer payments from relatives living on the mainland or from federal subsidies.

The unemployment rate was 29.8% in 2005 but improved to 23.8% as of 2010. In 2020, American Samoa's GDP was $709 million. Its GDP per capita (PPP) was $11,200 as of 2016.

=== Minimum wage ===
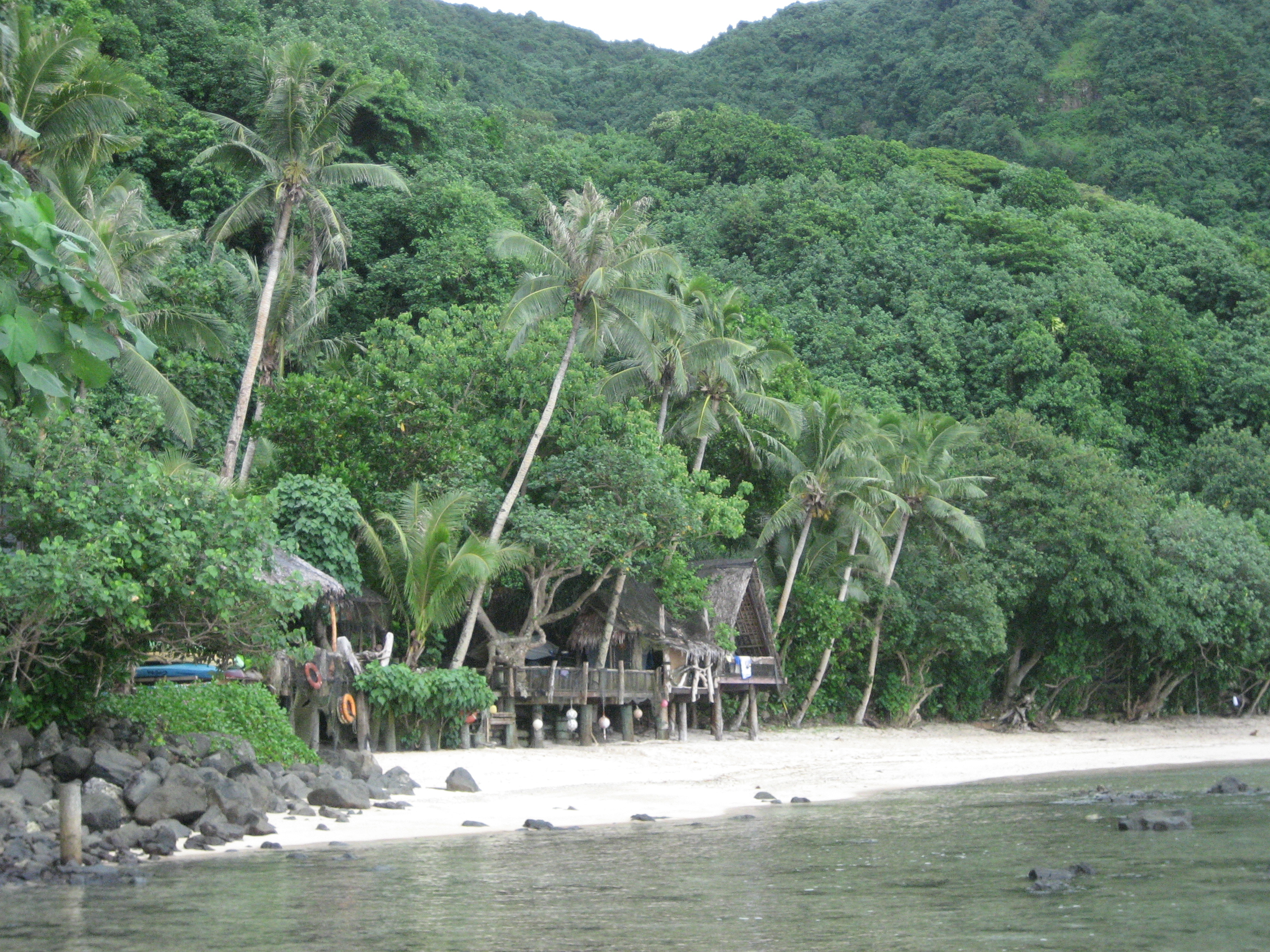
Tisa's Barefoot Bar & Grill

The Fair Labor Standards Act of 1938 has contained special provisions for American Samoa since its inception, citing its limited economy. American Samoan wages are based on the recommendations of a Special Industry Committee meeting bi-annually. Originally, the act contained provisions for other territories, provisions which were phased out as those territories developed more diverse economies.

In 2007, the Fair Minimum Wage Act of 2007 was passed, increasing the minimum wage in American Samoa by 50¢ per hour in 2007 and another 50¢ per hour each year thereafter until the minimum wage in American Samoa equals the federal minimum wage of $7.25 per hour in the United States. In response to the minimum wage increase, the Chicken of the Sea tuna canning plant was shut down in 2009, and 2,041 employees were laid off in the process. The other major tuna canning plant in American Samoa is StarKist, which began laying off workers in August 2010, with plans to lay off a total of 800 workers due to the minimum wage increases and other rising operation costs. American Samoa Governor Togiola Tulafono suggested that, rather than laying off minimum wage workers, the companies could reduce salaries and bonuses of top-tier employees.

=== Taxation ===
As in other U.S. territories, the U.S. federal government imposes payroll taxes and the equivalent self-employment tax on income from work in American Samoa, but not the federal income tax on income generated in American Samoa by its residents (except from work as U.S. government employees). Instead, the government of American Samoa itself taxes the worldwide income of its residents, as well as the income generated there by nonresidents, largely under the same rules and rates as the U.S. tax code in effect in 2000, with certain modifications such as a minimum tax rate of 4%. A similar situation applies to corporations. In 1983, the use of citizenship in taxation by American Samoa (due to its incorporation of the U.S. tax code) was ruled unconstitutional.

The U.S. federal government does not impose estate or gift taxes on property not located in the United States (states and District of Columbia) owned by residents of a U.S. territory (including American Samoa) who are not U.S. citizens or who acquired U.S. citizenship by birth or naturalization in that same U.S. territory. However, these taxes still apply to residents of a U.S. territory who acquired U.S. citizenship by birth or naturalization in a different part of the U.S. or by descent. It has been argued that this distinction based on place of birth, and not only residence or citizenship, is a rare case of unconstitutional tax discrimination, but it has never been challenged in court. The government of American Samoa itself does not impose estate or gift taxes.

Unlike U.S. citizens, U.S. nationals without U.S. citizenship (the status of most American Samoans) who do not reside in the United States or any U.S. territory enjoy the unique combination of maintaining a U.S. passport and the right of return to the U.S. while not being subject to U.S. federal income tax on their non-U.S. income, or to U.S. federal estate or gift taxes on their non-U.S. property. U.S. citizens (or anyone) cannot acquire this status after birth.

American Samoa does not impose a sales tax, but it imposes a general import tax of 8%. American Samoa is an independent customs territory, whose importation rules and taxes differ from those applicable to other parts of the United States.

=== Telecommunications ===
Some aspects of telecommunications in American Samoa are, like other U.S. territories, inferior to that of the mainland United States; a 2012 estimate showed that American Samoa's Internet speed was slower than that of several Eastern European countries.

In 2012 Michael Calabrese, Daniel Calarco, and Colin Richardson stated that American Samoa had the most expensive internet of any U.S. territory and that the speeds were only slightly superior to those of dial-up internet in the U.S. Mainland in the 1990s. They also stated that many American Samoans are too poor to afford "high-speed internet".

== Transportation ==
American Samoa Route Marker – Main Road

American Samoa has 150 miles (240 km) of highways (estimated in 2008). The maximum speed limit is 30 miles per hour. Ports and harbors include Aunuʻu, Auasi, Faleasao, Ofu and Pago Pago. American Samoa has no railways. The territory has three airports, all of which have paved runways. The main airport is Pago Pago International Airport, on the island of Tutuila. The Manuʻa group has two airports: Ofu Airport on the island of Ofu, and Fitiuta Airport on the island of Taʻū. According to a 1999 estimate, the territory has no merchant marine.

On June 8, 1922, the first bus service on Tutuila began its operations. The ʻaiga bus system travels across the island of Tutuila.

== Demographics ==
As of 2022, the population of American Samoa is estimated around 45,443 people. The 2020 census counted 49,710 people, 97.5% of whom lived on the largest island, Tutuila. About 57.6% of the population were born in American Samoa, 28.6% in independent Samoa, 6.1% in other parts of the United States, 4.5% in Asia, 2.9% in other parts of Oceania, and 0.2% elsewhere. At least 69% of the population had a parent born outside American Samoa.

American Samoa is small enough to have just one ZIP code, 96799, and uses the U.S. Postal Service (state code "AS") for mail delivery.

=== Ethnicity and language ===
In the 2020 census, 89.4% of the population reported at least partial Samoan ethnicity, 83.2% only Samoan, 5.8% Asian, 5.5% other Pacific island ethnicities, 4.4% mixed, and 1.1% other ethnicities. The Samoan language was spoken at home by 87.9% of the population, while 6.1% spoke other Pacific island languages, 3.3% spoke English, 2.1% spoke an Asian language, and 0.5% spoke other languages; 47.2% of the population spoke English at home or "very well". In 2022, Samoan and English were designated as official languages of the territory. At least some of the deaf population use Samoan Sign Language.

=== Religion ===
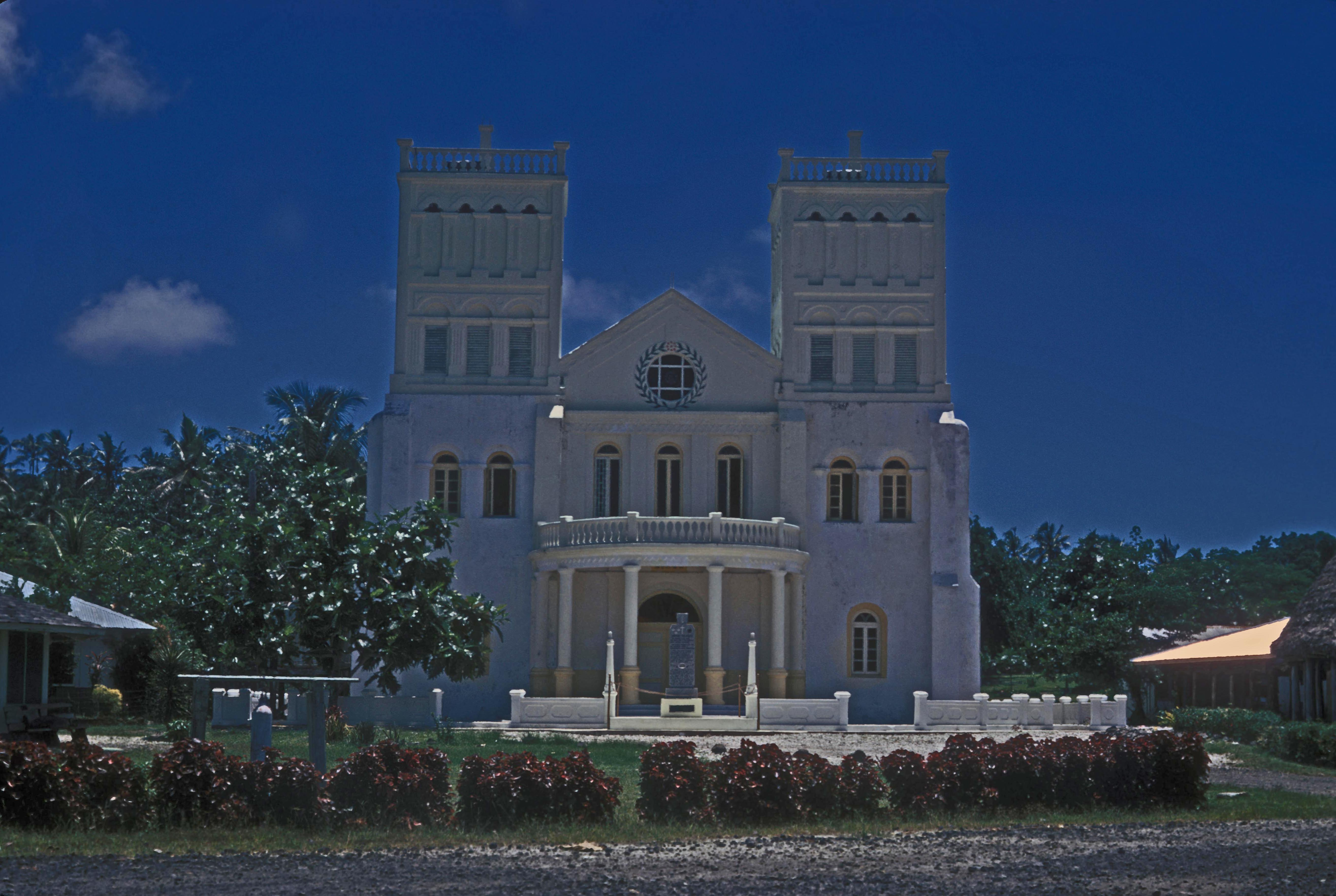
Zion Church in Leone

Major Christian denominations on the island include the Congregational Christian Church in American Samoa, the Catholic Church, The Church of Jesus Christ of Latter-day Saints, and the Methodist Church of Samoa. Collectively, these churches account for the vast majority of the population.

J. Gordon Melton in his book claims that Methodists, Congregationalists with the London Missionary Society, and Catholics led the first Christian missions to the islands. Other denominations arrived later, beginning in 1895 with the Seventh-day Adventists, various Pentecostals (including the Assemblies of God), Church of the Nazarene, Jehovah's Witnesses and The Church of Jesus Christ of Latter-day Saints.

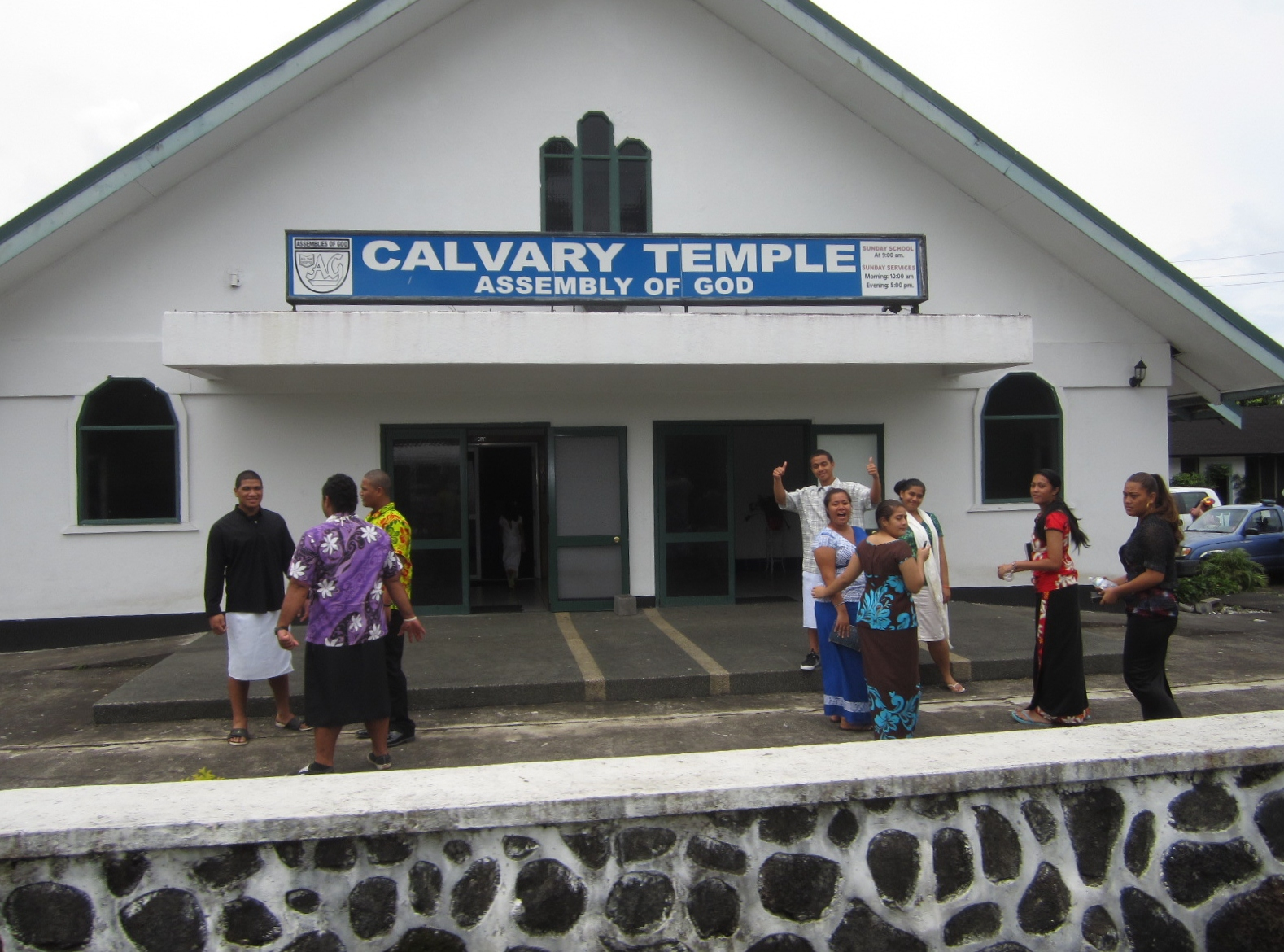
One of many churches in Samoa

CIA Factbook 2010 estimate shows the religious affiliations of American Samoa as 98.3% Christian, other 1%, unaffiliated 0.7%. World Christian Database 2010 estimate shows the religious affiliations of American Samoa as 98.3% Christian, 0.7% agnostic, 0.4% Chinese Universalist, 0.3% Buddhist and 0.3% followers of the Baháʼí Faith.

According to Pew Research Center, 98.3% of the total population is Christian. Among Christians, 59.5% are Protestant, 19.7% are Catholic and 19.2% are other Christians. A major Protestant church on the island, gathering a substantial part of the local Protestant population, is the Congregational Christian Church in American Samoa, a Reformed denomination in the Congregationalist tradition. As of April 2023, The Church of Jesus Christ of Latter-day Saints website claims a membership of 16,512 (nearly 30% of American Samoa's entire population), with 43 congregations and five family history centers. Jehovah's Witnesses claim 210 "ministers of the word" and three congregations.

The Catholic Church has at least 18 churches in the territory and 29 parishes under the Diocese of Samoa-Pago Pago (Diœcesis Samoa-Pagopagensis) which was created in 1982 by Pope John Paul II through the bull Studiose quidem and constitutes a suffragan see of the Archdiocese of Samoa-Apia. The bishop has his see in the Cathedral of the Holy Family in Tafuna and in the Co-cathedral of St. Joseph the Worker in Fagatogo.

=== Education ===
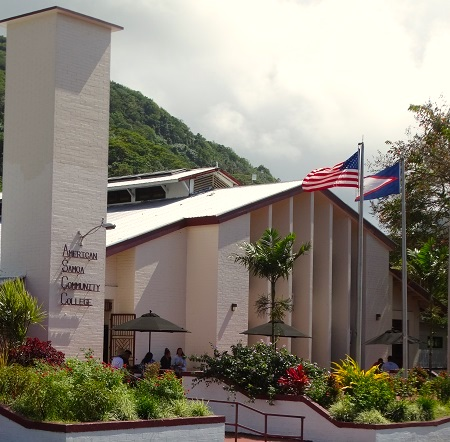
American Samoa Community College

The island contains 23 primary schools. Of the ten secondary schools, five are operated by the American Samoa Department of Education; the other five are either administered by religious denominations or are privately owned. American Samoa Community College, founded in 1970, provides post-secondary education on the islands.

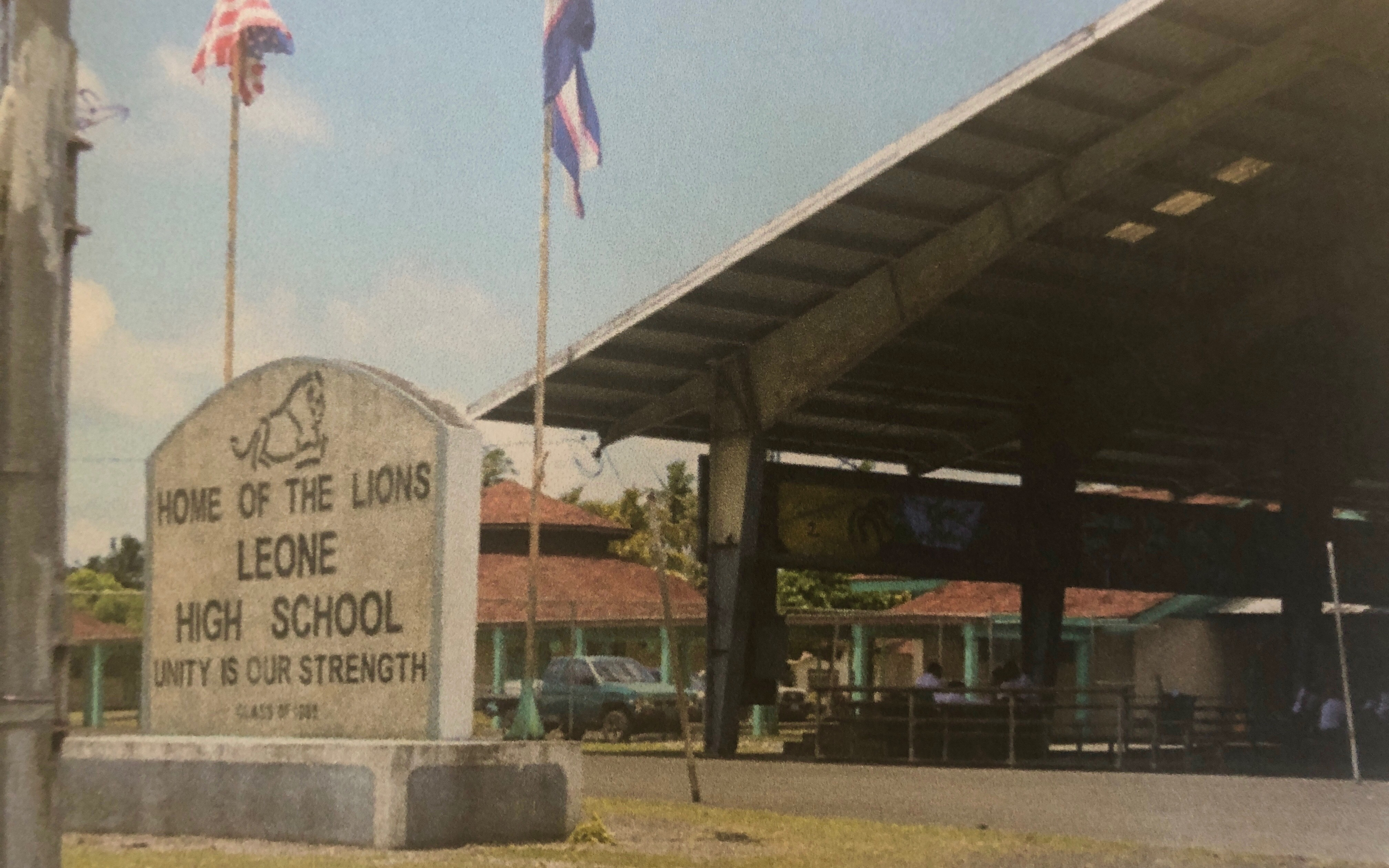
Leone High School

American Samoa was home to one high school as of 1961, which existed due to the matai's pressure on the naval governor to transform the old Marine barracks at Utulei into a school. The teenagers of well-off and more politically connected families attended the school, which would later be known as Samoana High School. With a median age of 15, the demand for more high schools was increasing, and three new high schools were established by 1968. Another two soon followed, and by 1979, 2,800 high school students were attending six public and private high schools in American Samoa. Looking for a cost-effective way for educational reformation, Governor H. Rex Lee introduced the public television system in 1964.

When TV was introduced, there were 6,000 educational programs produced annually; by 1981, only one series comprising 40-minute lessons in English-language skills was still aired. One of the side effects of advertising in popular programming from the U.S. was an increase in sales of over-the-counter drugs such as Pepto-Bismol and Sominex, with television being directly blamed for the decline of village life.

== Culture ==
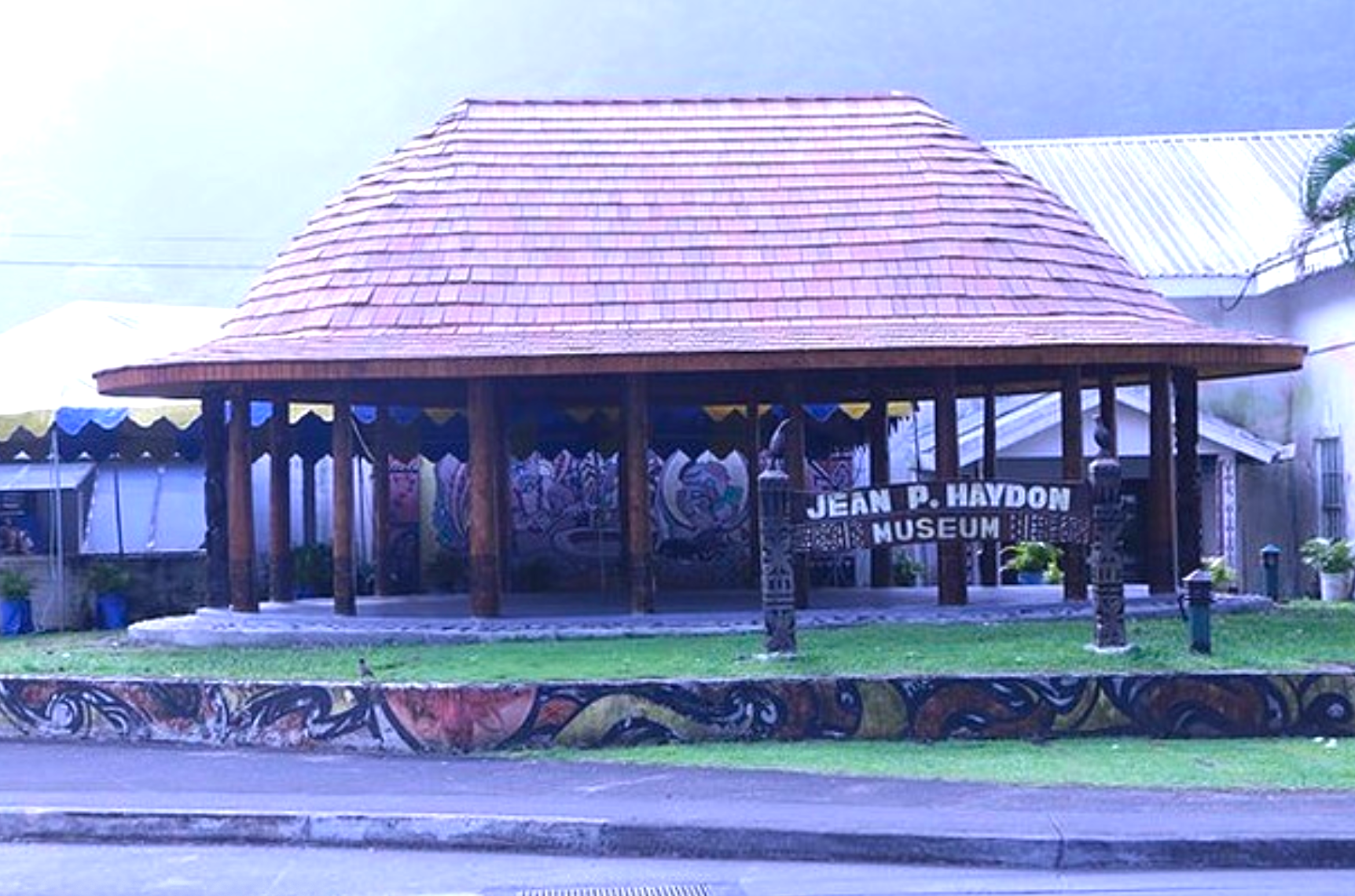
Jean P. Haydon Museum in Pago Pago

The Samoan culture has developed over 3,500 years and largely withstood interaction with European cultures. It was adapted well to the teachings of Christianity. The Samoan language is still in use in daily exchange; however, English is widely used and also the legal official language. Besides Samoan language classes and cultural courses, all instructions in public schools are in English. The basic unit of the American Samoa culture is the ʻaiga (family). It consists of both immediate and extended family.

The matai, or chief, is the head of the ʻaiga. The chief is the custodian of all ʻaiga properties. A village (nuʻu) is made up of several or many ʻaiga with a common or shared interest. Each ʻaiga is represented by their chief in the village councils.

=== Music ===
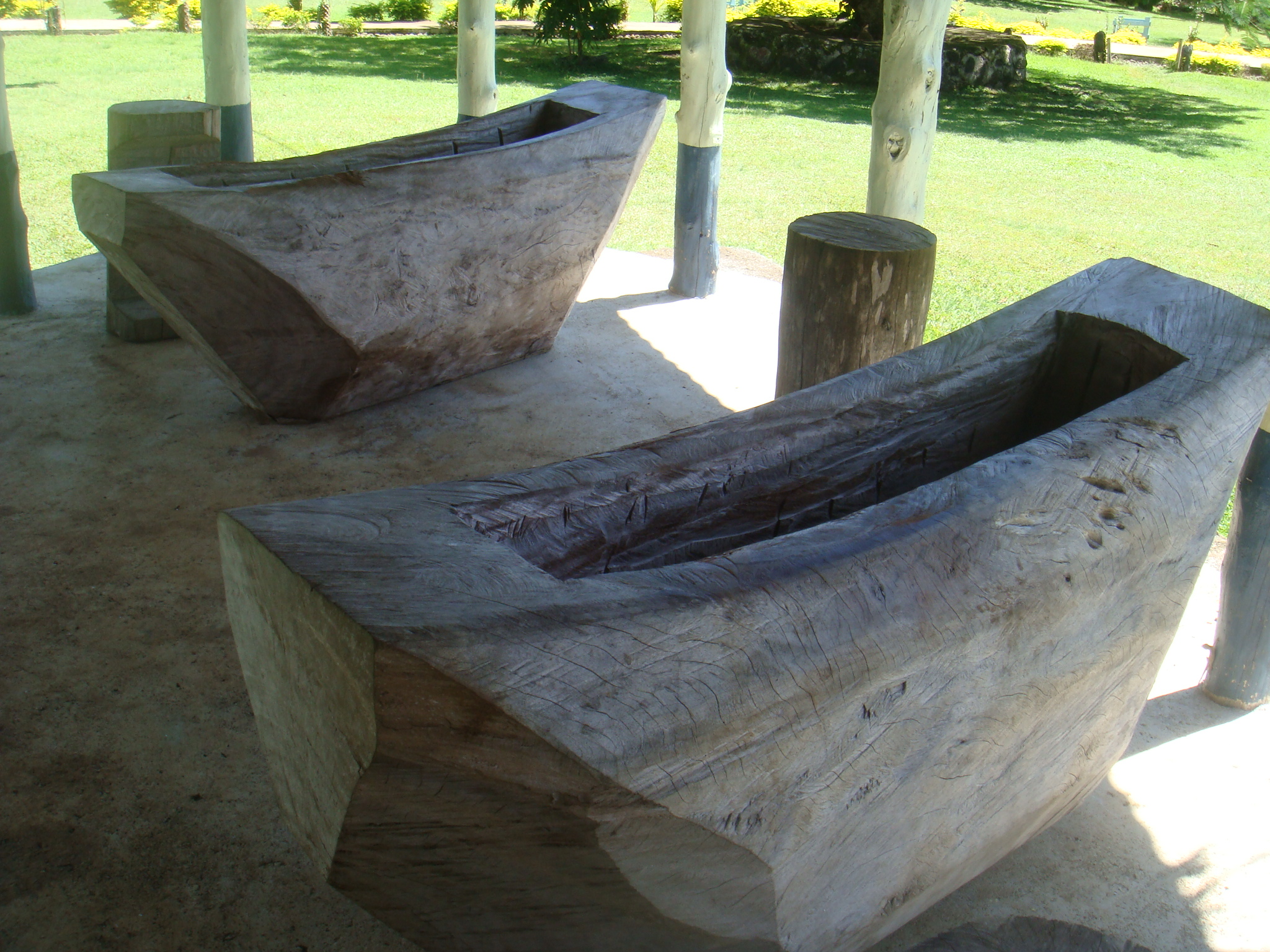
Samoan Talipalau log drums at Piula Theological College, distant ancestor of the Fijian Lali drums

The music of Samoa is a complex mix of cultures and traditions, with pre- and post-European contact histories. Since American colonization, popular traditions such as rap and hip-hop have been integrated into Samoan music.

Traditional Samoan musical instruments include several different distinctive instruments, including a fala, which is a rolled-up mat beaten with sticks and several types of slit drum.

=== Sports ===
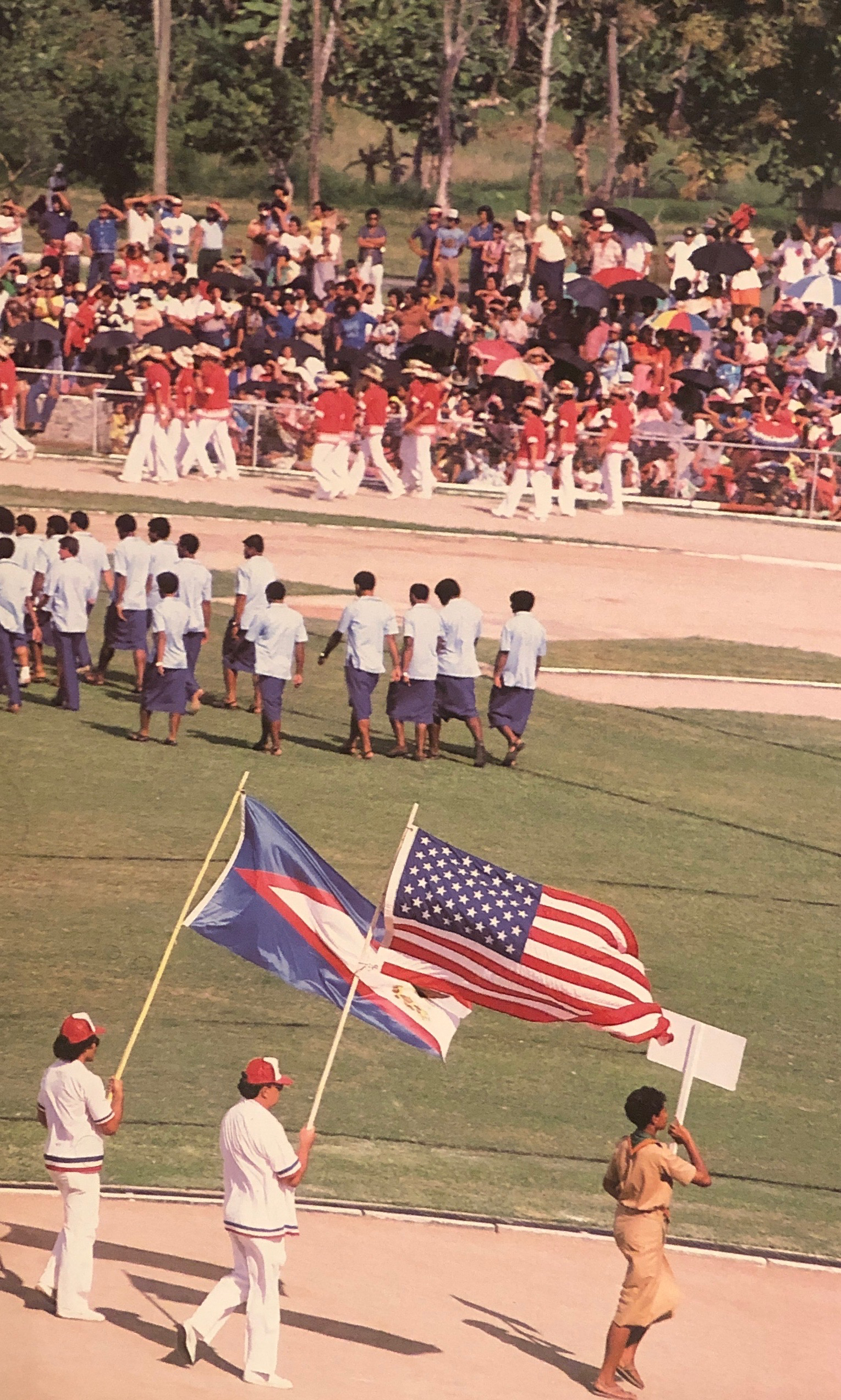
American Samoa at the South Pacific Games

The main sports played in American Samoa are football, Samoan cricket, canoeing, yachting, basketball, golf, netball, tennis, rugby, table tennis, boxing, bowling, volleyball, and fishing tournaments. Some current and former sports clubs are the American Samoa Tennis Association, Rugby Unions, Lavalava Golf Club, and Gamefish Association. Leagues improved and organized better after the completion of the Veterans Memorial Stadium.

The 1997 South Pacific Mini Games were the biggest international event ever to take place in American Samoa. The bid to host the games for the 23 participating countries was approved in May 1993. In January 1994, Governor A. P. Lutali appointed Fuga Teleso to head the task force charged with game preparations, including the construction of a stadium. Groundbreaking was in January 1994. The Governor later handed the task force on preparations to Lieutenant Governor Togiola. The task force merged with the American Samoa National Olympics Committee to better coordinate and facilitate preparations. V.P. Willis Construction built the 1,500-seat stands. The Department of Public Safety trained its force for special games security. The opening ceremony became extravagant where the U.S. Army Reserve carried the torch from Tula and Leone.

About 2,000 athletes, coaches, and sponsors attended from 19 countries and competed in 11 sports at the game. American Samoa fielded a team of 248 athletes. The team won 48 medals, 22 of which were gold medals, and American Samoa came in fourth overall in the ratings. American Samoa Rotary Club honored Fuga Tolani Teleso with the community's top award, the Paul Harris Fellowship Award, for his work on constructing the Veterans Memorial Stadium.

In 1982, yachters competed in the Hobie World Championship held in Tahiti. American Samoa beat the Apia team by half a point and won the Samoa Cup. In 1983, a team coached by Adele Satele-Galeai brought home the winning trophy from the Regional women's volleyball tournament in Hawaii. Also in 1983, the South Pacific Games were held in Apia. American Samoa received 13 medals: four gold, four silver, and five bronze. That same year, three junior golfers made the cut out of 1,000 players to attend the World Junior Golf Tournament in San Diego, California.

In 1987, American Samoa became the 167th member of the International Olympic Committee. The first South Pacific Junior Tennis Tournament was held at the Tafuna courts in January 1990.

Tony Solaita was the first American Samoan to play in Major League Baseball. There are thirty players from American Samoa in the National Football League (NFL) as of 2015 and over 200 play Div. I NCAA Football. Some American Samoan NFL football players are Shalom Luani, Junior Siavii, Jonathan Fanene, Mosi Tatupu, Shaun Nua, Isaac Sopoaga, and Daniel Teʻo-Nesheim.

After World War II, a Welfare and Recreation Department was created. This department arranged bowling, softball, badminton tournaments, basketball, and volleyball at various Tutuila locations. Boxing matches and dancing also became popular activities.

==== American football ====
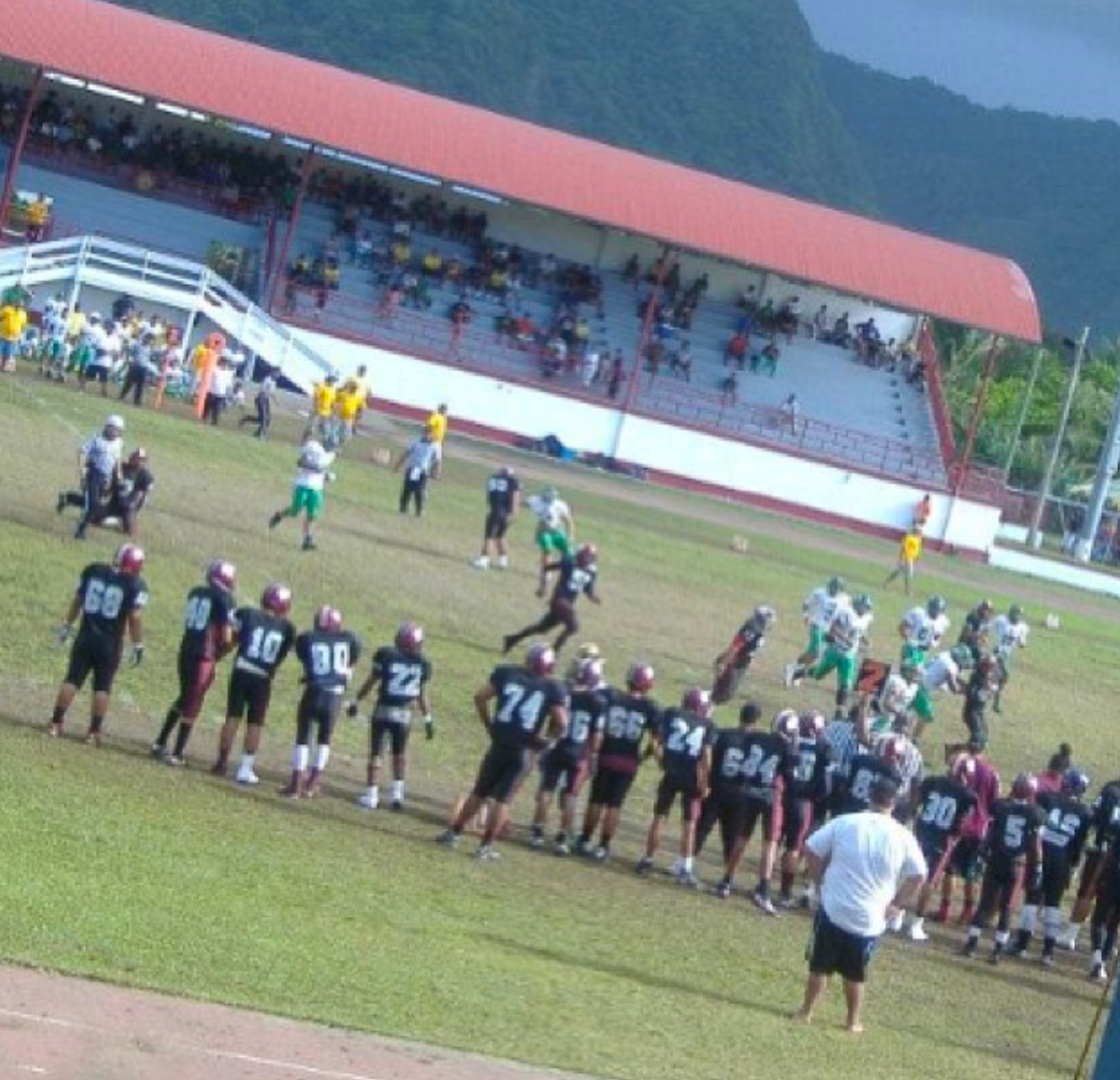
High school football game

As of 2010, 30 ethnic Samoans, all from American Samoa, played in the National Football League, and more than 200 played NCAA Division I college football. In recent years, it has been estimated that a Samoan male (either an American Samoan, or a Samoan living in the mainland United States) is anywhere from 40 to 56 times more likely to play in the NFL than a non-Samoan American, giving American Samoa the nickname "Football Islands". Samoans are the most disproportionately overrepresented ethnic group in the National Football League.

Six-time All-Pro Junior Seau was one of the most famous Americans of Samoan heritage ever to play in the NFL, having been elected to the NFL 1990s All-Decade Team and Pro Football Hall of Fame. Pittsburgh Steelers safety Troy Polamalu, though born and raised in the mainland United States, is another famous American of Samoan heritage to have played in the NFL, not having his hair cut since 2000 (and only because a USC coach told him he had to) and wearing it down during games in honor of his heritage. The football culture was featured on 60 Minutes on January 17, 2010.

At the 2016 Republican National Convention, American Samoa's delegation said American Samoa is "the greatest exporter of NFL players".

==== Association football ====
The Football Federation American Samoa oversees men's and women's national teams. The men's national team made its international debut in the 1983 South Pacific Games, losing its opener against Western Samoa. Despite scoring a win against Wallis and Futuna, the team did not exit the group stage. The team lost to Australia 31–0 in a FIFA World Cup qualifying match on April 11, 2001, but on November 22, 2011, they finally won their first FIFA World Cup qualifier, beating Tonga 2–1. The appearance of American Samoa's Jaiyah Saelua, who is faʻafafine, in the contest "apparently became the first transgender player to compete on a World Cup stage".

The women's national team made its international debut at the 1998 OFC Women's Championship, losing both of its matches: 21–0 to Australia and 9–0 to Papua New Guinea.

The American Samoan men's national team features in the highly rated 2014 British film Next Goal Wins. The film documents the team's 2014 FIFA World Cup qualifying campaign, in which they achieved their first-ever international win. Saelua and Nicky Salapu, the man famous for being the goalkeeper during the team's 31–0 loss to Australia in 2001, feature prominently in the film. A feature film adaptation of the documentary was released in 2023 and was directed by Taika Waititi.

==== Rugby league ====
The American Samoa national rugby league team represents the country in international rugby league. The team competed in the 1988, 1992, 1998 and 2004 Pacific Cup competitions. The team has also competed in the 2003 and 2004 World Sevens qualifiers in the 2005 World Sevens. America Samoa's first match in the international Rugby League was in the 1988 Pacific Cup against Tonga, Tonga won the match 38–14 which is still the biggest loss by an American Samoan side. American Samoa's biggest win was in 2004 against New Caledonia with a final score of 62–6.

American Samoa gets broadcasts of the National Rugby League in Australia on free-to-air television.

There is also a new movement that aims to set up a four-team domestic competition in American Samoa.

==== Rugby union ====
Rugby union is a growing sport in American Samoa. The first rugby game recorded in American Samoa was in 1924, since then the development of the game had been heavily overshadowed by the influence of American football during the 1970s. The highest governing body of rugby in American Samoa is the American Samoa Rugby Union which was founded in 1990 and was not affiliated with the IRB until 2012. Internationally, two American Samoans have played for the New Zealand national rugby union team, known as the All Blacks. Frank Solomon (born in Pago Pago) became the first American national of Samoan descent to play for a New Zealand team. Considered a pacific pioneer in New Zealand rugby, Solomon scored a try against Australia in the inaugural Bledisloe Cup match in 1932, which New Zealand won 21–13.

The second American Samoan to play for the All Blacks is Jerome Kaino (born in Fagaʻalu). A native of Leone, Kaino moved to New Zealand when he was four. In 2004, at age 21, he played his first match for New Zealand against the Barbarians where he scored his first try, contributing to New Zealand's 47–19 victory that resulted in him becoming a man of the match. He also played a crucial role in the Rugby World Cup 2011 playing every match in the tournament. He scored four tries in the event which led to New Zealand winning the final against France 8–7. Kaino was also a key member of the 2015 Rugby World Cup squad, where he played every match including a try he scored in the quarterfinals against France which New Zealand won 62–13. He scored again in the semifinals against South Africa, which New Zealand won 20–18. He played in the World Cup final against Australia where New Zealand won again 34–17 to become world champions for a record three times (1987, 2011, and 2015). Kaino is one of twenty New Zealand rugby players to have won the Rugby World Cup twice, back to back in 2011 and 2015. In August 2015, the American Samoa Rugby Union Board selected Leota Toma Patu from the village of Leone as the coach for the Talavalu 15 men's team that represented American Samoa at the Ocean Cup 2015 in Papua New Guinea.

==== Other sports ====
- Boxing: Maselino Masoe, who represented American Samoa in three consecutive Olympics from 1988 to 1996, was WBA middleweight champion from 2004 to 2006.
- Professional wrestling: Several American Samoan athletes have been very visible in professional wrestling. The Anoaʻi family in particular has had many of its members employed by WWE.
- Sumo wrestling: Some Samoan Sumo wrestlers, most famously Musashimaru and Konishiki, have reached the highest ranks of ōzeki and yokozuna.
- Track and field: Hammer thrower Lisa Misipeka attracted international attention by winning a bronze medal in the 1999 World Championships in Athletics.

== Recreation ==
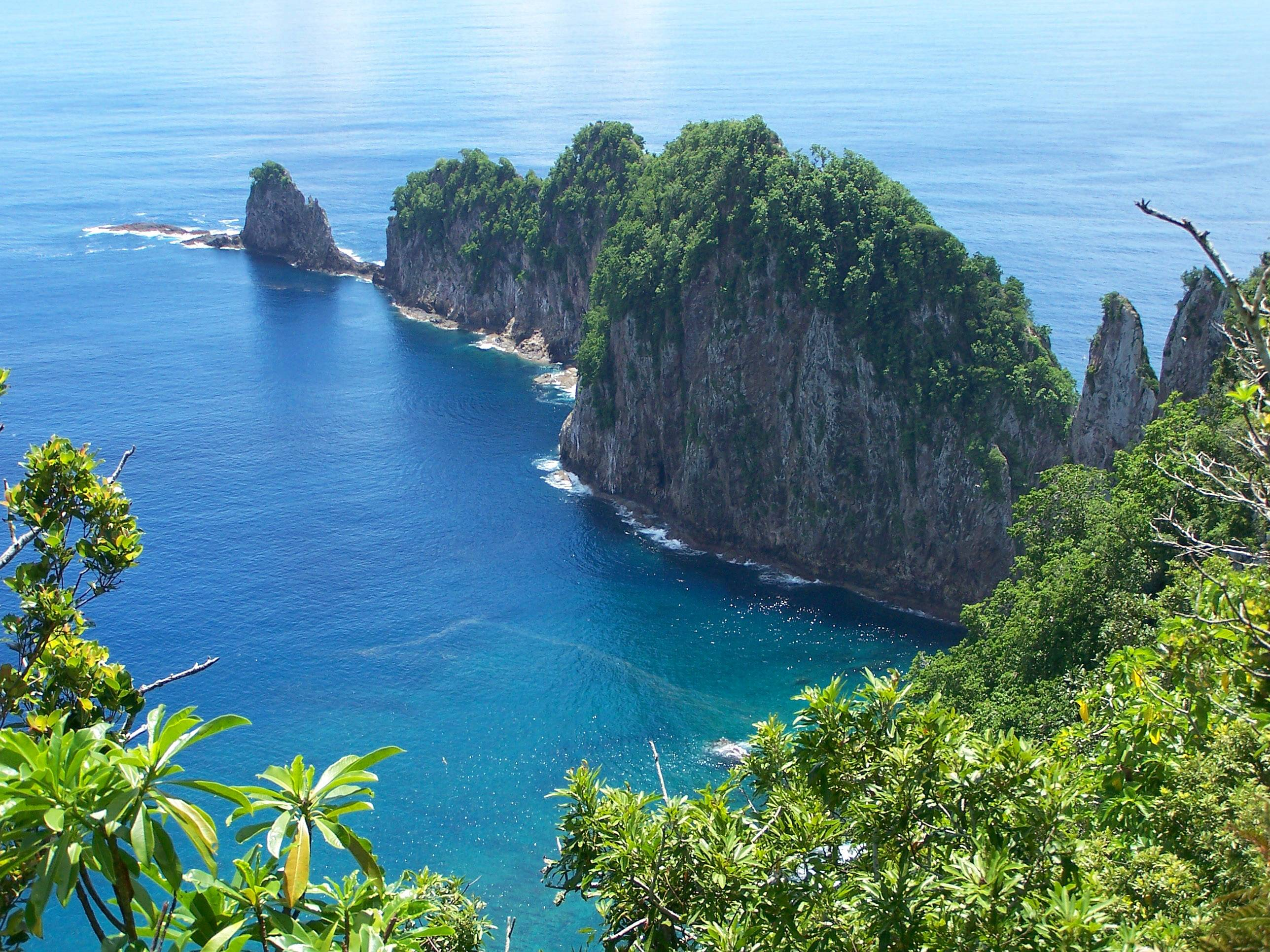
Pola Island

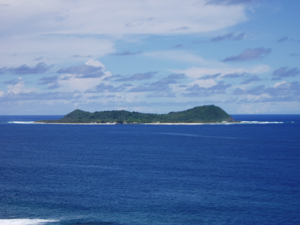
Aunuʻu Island

A team from the Bureau of Outdoor Recreation conducted a parks survey on American Samoa in the 1960s. Their team recommended sites at Cape Taputapu, Leʻala at Vailoatai, Aʻoloau (the plateau), Matautuloa Point, Nuʻuuli, Matafao Peak, Pago Pago, Vaiʻava Strait, Anasosopo, ʻAoa, Cape Matautuloa, and Aunuʻu Island. After an initial objection, Secretary Leʻiato gave his support and was appointed Chairman of the Territorial Parks and Recreation Committee. The first field meeting for a parkland acquisition was held between Judge Morrow on behalf of the government and the village council of Vatia to make the Pola Island area a public park. The dredge Palolo was hired from Upolu in January 1966 in order to dredge sand for Utulei Beach. A specialist in beach developments, Ala Varone of the Army, directed the project. The centerpiece of the park was to be at the head of Pago Pago Harbor, where it proposed a 13-acre site created by the dredge. The park would have facilities for sports and recreation as well as facilities for boats and the growing number of Asian immigrants arriving from Korea, Japan, and China.

The Department of Parks and Recreation was created by law in 1980 and the Parks Commission was also established. In 1981, Governor Peter Tali Coleman appointed Fuga Tolani Teleso as Director of Parks and Recreation. On May 25, 1984, a groundbreaking ceremony was held at the Onesosopo reclamation to initiate work on the first park in the Eastern District.

At the urging of Paul Cox, High Chief Nafanua of Falealupo, and the Bat Preservers Association, Congressman Fofō Iosefa Fiti Sunia introduced a bill in 1984 which would enter American Samoa into the Federal Fish and Wildlife Restoration Act. The purpose of the bill was to protect the ancient paleotropical rainforests and the flying fox megabat. The signing marked the beginning of American Samoa's entry into the U.S. National Park System. In July 1987, the National Park Service began establishing a federal park, the National Park of American Samoa. An initial appropriation of $400,000 was made in 1989. It contains one of the world's most remarkable rainforest and coastal reef ecologies and spreads across three islands. One of the most popular sites on Tutuila Island include Pola Rock, a rise of sheer rock formations that protrudes over 400 feet (120 m) above the ocean's surface. It is located off the shores of Vatia. On September 19, 1991, Governor Peter Tali Coleman and Department of the Interior secretary Manuel Lujan signed leases formalizing the establishment of the fiftieth U.S. National Park.

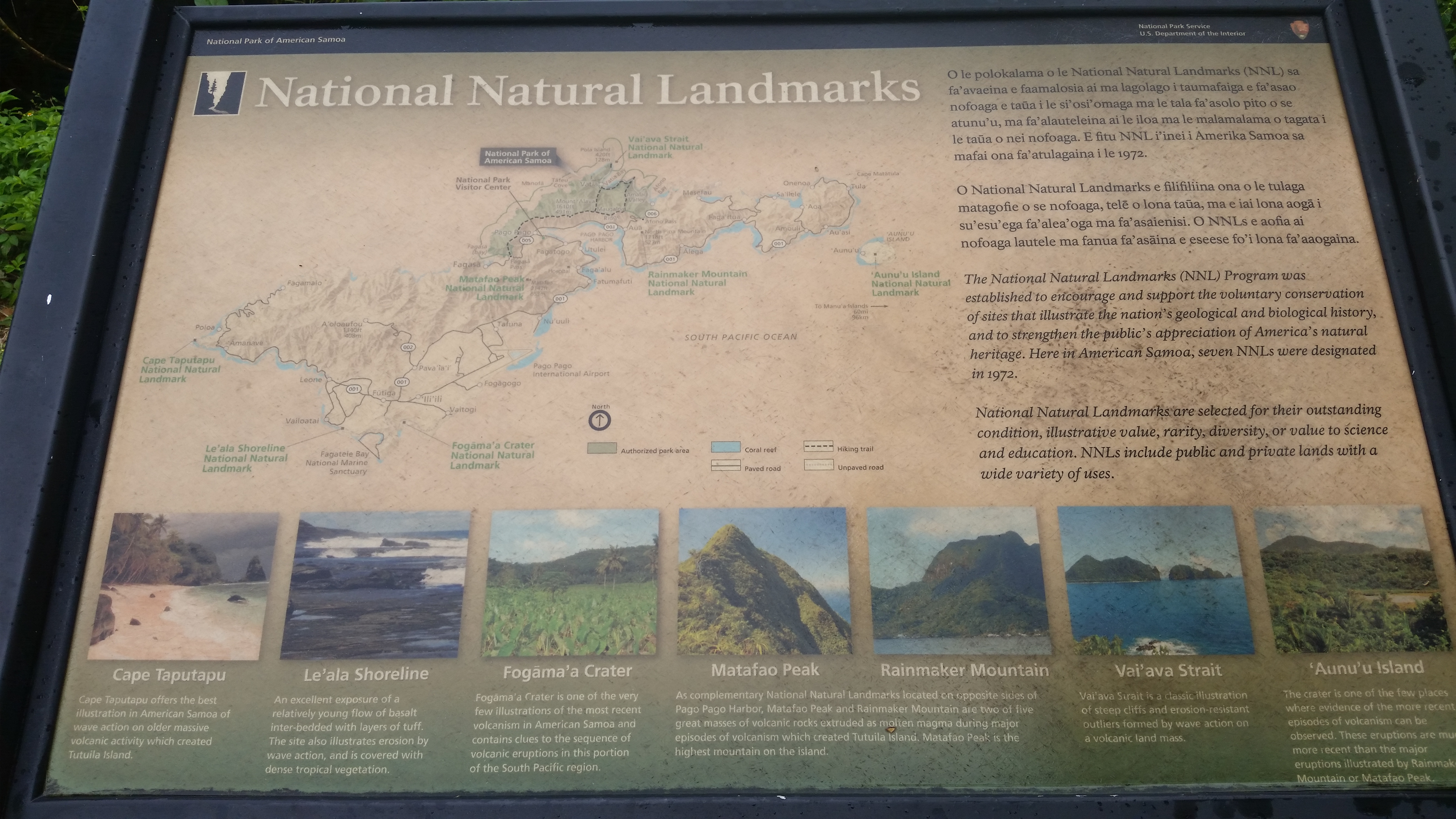
National Natural Landmarks

The ASG Parks and Recreation oversees the maintenance of all public parks, including the Amanave Mini Park, Lions Park in Tafuna, Onesosopo Park in Aua, Malaloa Mini Park, Fagaʻalu Park, Tia Seu Lupe historical site at Fatuoaiga, Pago Pago Park, Pago Pago Tennis Courts, the Little League Softball Field, Tony Solaʻita Baseball Field, Solo Ridge at the Utulei Tramway, Utulei Beach Park and Suʻigaulaoleatuvasa in Utulei.

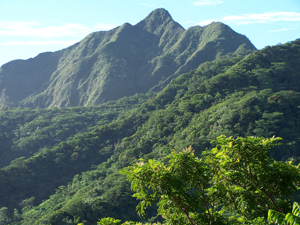
Matafao Peak National Natural Landmark

American Samoa has seven areas designated as National Natural Landmarks on Tutuila Island. This program is administrated by the U.S. National Park Service and the areas contain unique ecological or geological features. Except Vaiʻava Strait, none of the areas are within the National Park of American Samoa. American Samoa's seven National Natural Landmarks (NNL) were designated in 1972:

- Cape Taputapu
- Fogamaʻa Crater
- Matafao Peak
- Leʻala Shoreline
- Rainmaker Mountain
- Vaiʻava Strait
- Aunuʻu Island

== Wildlife ==
Notable terrestrial species include the Pacific tree boa and the Samoa flying fox, which has a three-foot wingspread. Two snake species can be found in American Samoa: The brahminy blind snake is found on Tutuila, while the Pacific tree boa occurs on Taʻū. The islands are home to five species of geckos: Pacific slender-toed gecko, oceanic gecko, mourning gecko, stump-toed gecko, and house gecko.

Turtles include the threatened green sea turtle and the endangered hawksbill sea turtle. Hawksbill sea turtles tend to nest on Tutuila beaches, while the green sea turtle is most common on Rose Atoll. Tutuila has the highest number of nesting turtles, consisting of around fifty nesting females per year.

American Samoa is home to one species of amphibian: the cane toad. Biologists estimate that there are over two million toads on Tutuila.

915 nearshore fish species have been recorded in American Samoa, compared to only 460 nearshore fish species in Hawaii. With over 950 species of native fish and 250 coral species, American Samoa has the greatest marine biodiversity in the United States. The National Marine Sanctuary of American Samoa is the largest marine sanctuary in the U.S. It is home to over 150 species of coral, including some of the largest and oldest corals of their genus in the world.

=== Fruit bats ===
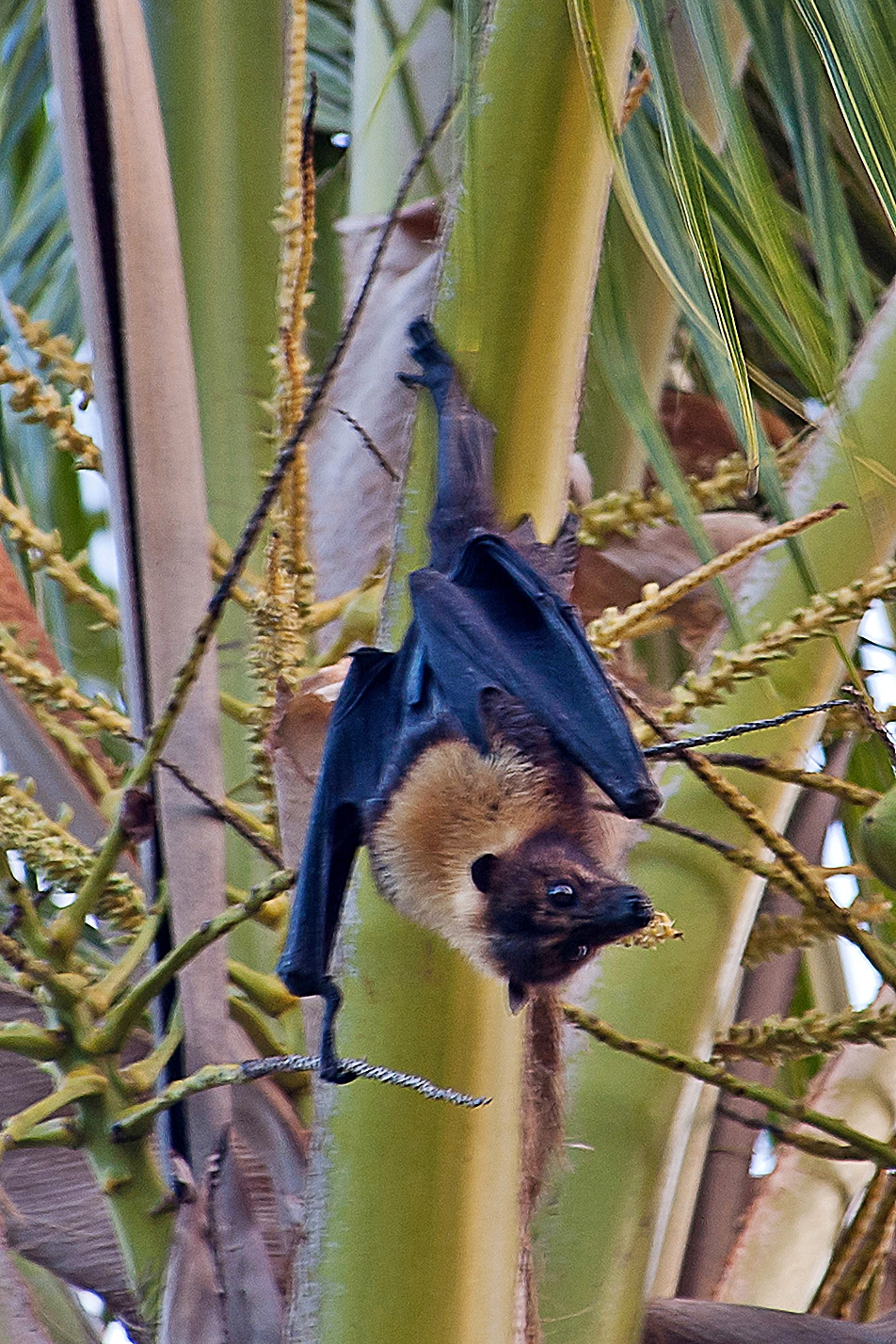
The Samoa flying fox is only found in Fiji and the Samoan Islands.

Megabats are the only native mammal in American Samoa. The islands are home to two species of fruit bats: Pacific flying fox and Samoa flying fox. The sheath-tailed bat is another species found here, which is a smaller insect-eating bat. In 1992, the American Samoa Government banned the hunting of fruit bats to help their populations recover. The Samoa flying fox is only found in Fiji and the Samoan Islands.

From 1995 to 2000, the population of Samoa flying fox remained stable at about 900 animals on Tutuila, and 100 in the Manuʻa Islands. As of 2000, scientists from the American Samoa Department of Marine and Wildlife Resource estimated that there are fewer than 5,500 Pacific flying foxes in American Samoa, and an estimated 900 or fewer Samoa flying foxes. The best and biggest known roost on Tutuila Island for the sheath-tailed bat is in the Anapeʻape Cove near Āfono.

Amalau Valley on Tutuila's north coast offers great roadside views of many bird species and both species of fruit bat. The valley has been called a prime bird- and bat-watching area.

=== Avifauna ===
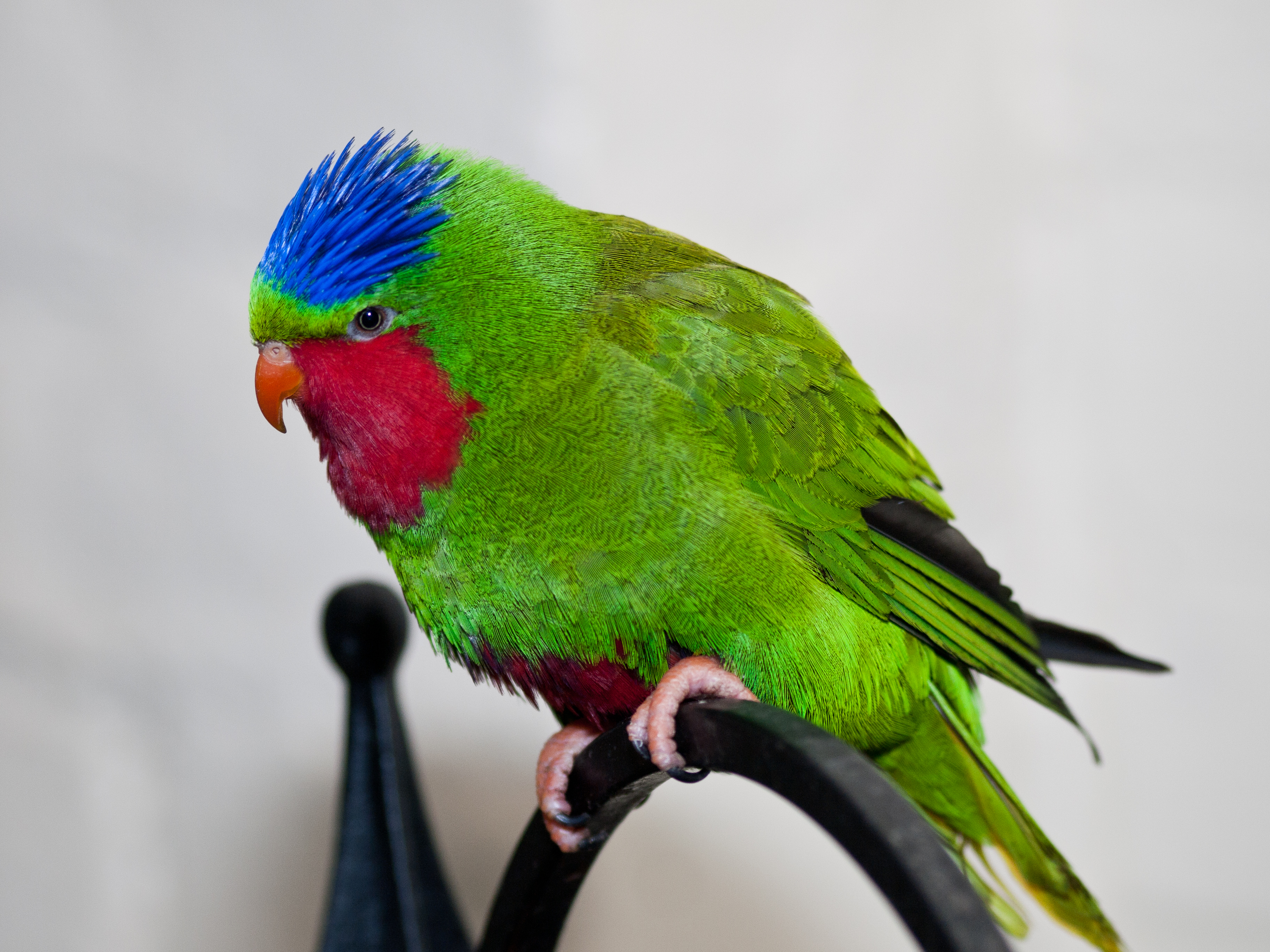
The blue-crowned lorikeet is the only parrot found in American Samoa.

Sixteen of the Samoan Islands' 34 bird species are found nowhere else on Earth. This includes the critically endangered tooth-billed pigeon. Four species of birds are only found in the Manuʻa Islands and not on Tutuila. These include American Samoa's only parrot, the blue-crowned lory. Other special birds to Manuʻa are the lesser shrikebill and the friendly ground-dove. The spotless crake has only been observed on Taʻū Island.

There are more species of birds than all species of reptiles, mammals and amphibians combined. Native land birds include two honeyeaters: cardinal honeyeater and wattled honeyeater. Cardinal honeyeaters only occur on Tutuila Island. The only endemic land bird to American Samoa is the Samoan starling. Four pigeons are native to American Samoa: Pacific imperial pigeon, many-colored fruit dove, white-capped fruit dove, and shy ground dove. The local government banned all pigeon hunting in 1992.

The many-colored fruit dove is one of the rarest birds that nest on Tutuila. Studies in the 1980s estimated their population size at Tutuila to be only around 80 birds. Amalau Valley has been described as the best place in American Samoa to observe the many-colored fruit dove.

The offshore islet of Pola Island near Vatia is a nesting site for many seabird species and an excellent area to observe seabirds. The Pola region of Vatia and Rose Atoll are the only places in American Samoa where there are breeding colonies of red-footed boobies.

Birds that depend on freshwater habitat include the Pacific reef heron and Pacific black duck, the Samoan Islands' only species of duck. The largest wetland areas are the pala lagoons in Nuʻuuli and Leone as well as Pala Lake on Aunuʻu Island.

== See also ==
- Index of American Samoa-related articles
- List of lakes in American Samoa
- List of National Natural Landmarks in American Samoa
- List of people from American Samoa
- National Register of Historic Places listings in American Samoa
- Outline of American Samoa
- Polynesia
