= Manifest destiny =

19th-century expansionist belief in the U.S.

Manifest Destiny
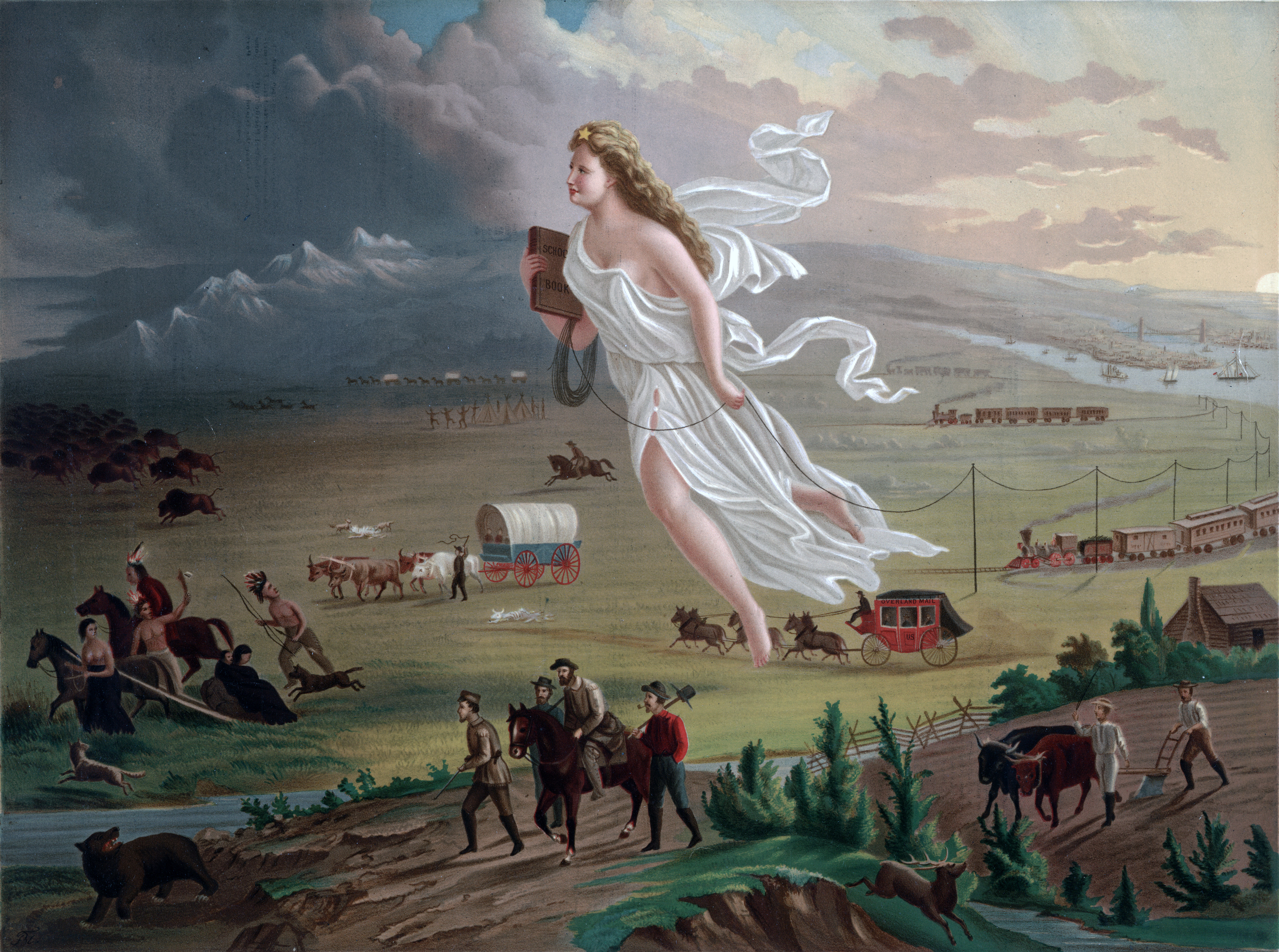
- American Progress (1872) by John Gast – Columbia leads American settlers westward, symbolizing the spread of westernization, civilization, modernization, technology, and commerce, while Indigenous Americans are driven from their homeland.
- Date: 1845 – approx. 1910
- Location: United States
- Also known as: Westward expansion
- Type: Expansionist belief / Political ideology
- Cause: American exceptionalism, white supremacism
- Outcome: Mexican Cession, ethnic cleansing of indigenous peoples via the Indian Removal Act
- The concept remains in modern political thought & discourse. Key figures: John L. O'Sullivan, John Quincy Adams, Andrew Jackson, James K. Polk, Theodore Roosevelt; Related concepts: American exceptionalism, Continentalism, American imperialism

Manifest destiny was the expansionist colonial belief in the 19th-century United States that American settlers were destined to expand westward across North America, and that this belief was both obvious ("manifest") and certain ("destiny"). The belief is rooted in American exceptionalism, romantic nationalism, Anglo-Saxonism, and nascent ideas of white chauvinism, (Note: Attributed to multiple references:) implying the inevitable spread of republicanism and the American way. It is one of the earliest expressions of American imperialism. According to historian William Earl Weeks, there were three basic tenets behind the concept: The assumption of the unique moral virtue of the United States, the assertion of its mission to redeem the world by the spread of republican government and more generally the "American way of life", and the faith in the nation's divinely ordained destiny to succeed in this mission.

Manifest destiny remained heavily divisive in politics, causing constant conflict with regard to slavery in these new states and territories. It is also associated with the expansion of European settlers onto the territories of Indigenous Americans and the annexation of lands to the west of the United States borders at the time on the continent. The concept became one of several major campaign issues during the 1844 presidential election, where the Democratic Party won and the phrase "Manifest Destiny" was coined within a year.

The concept of manifest destiny was used by Democrats to justify the 1846 Oregon boundary dispute and the 1845 annexation of Texas as a slave state, culminating in the 1846 Mexican–American War. In contrast, the large majority of Whigs and prominent Republicans (such as Abraham Lincoln and Ulysses S. Grant) rejected the concept and campaigned against these actions. By 1843, former U.S. president John Quincy Adams, originally a major supporter of the concept underlying manifest destiny, had changed his mind and repudiated expansionism because it meant the expansion of slavery in Texas. Ulysses S. Grant served in and condemned the Mexican–American War, declaring it "one of the most unjust ever waged by a stronger against a weaker nation".

After the American Civil War, the U.S. acquired Alaska in 1867. In the 1890s, Republican president William McKinley annexed Hawaii, the Philippines, Puerto Rico, Guam, and American Samoa. The 1898 Spanish–American War was controversial, and imperialism became a major issue in the 1900 United States presidential election. Historian Daniel Walker Howe summarizes that "American imperialism did not represent an American consensus; it provoked bitter dissent within the national polity".

== Context ==
There was never a set of principles defining manifest destiny; it was always a general idea rather than a specific policy made with a motto. Ill-defined but keenly felt, manifest destiny was an expression of conviction in the morality and value of expansionism that complemented other popular ideas of the era, including American exceptionalism and Romantic nationalism. Andrew Jackson, who spoke of "extending the area of freedom", typified the conflation of America's potential greatness, the nation's budding sense of Romantic self-identity, and its expansion.

Yet Jackson was not the only president to elaborate on the principles underlying manifest destiny. Owing in part to the lack of a definitive narrative outlining its rationale, proponents offered divergent or seemingly conflicting viewpoints. While many writers focused primarily upon American expansionism, be it into Mexico or across the Pacific, others saw the term as a call to example. Without an agreed-upon interpretation, much less an elaborated political philosophy, these conflicting views of America's destiny were never resolved. This variety of possible meanings was summed up by Ernest Lee Tuveson: "A vast complex of ideas, policies, and actions is comprehended under the phrase 'Manifest Destiny'. They are not, as we should expect, all compatible, nor do they come from any one source."

== Etymology ==
Most historians credit the conservative newspaper editor and future propagandist for the Confederacy, John O'Sullivan, with coining the term manifest destiny in 1845. However, other historians suggest the unsigned editorial titled "Annexation" in which it first appeared was written by journalist and annexation advocate Jane Cazneau.

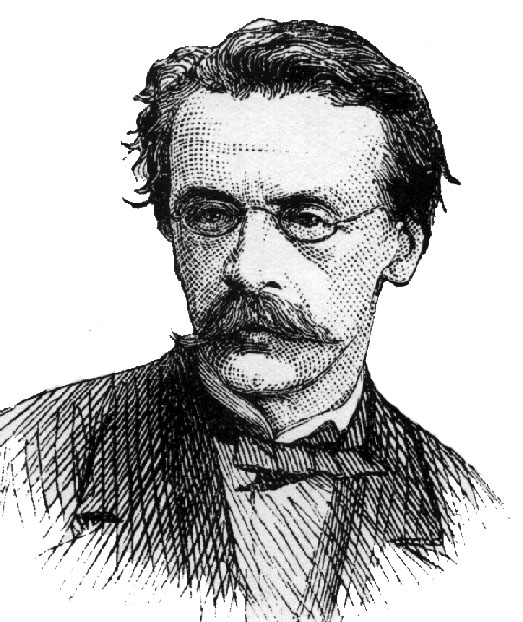
John L. O'Sullivan, sketched in 1874, was an influential columnist as a young man, but he is now generally remembered only for his use of the phrase "manifest destiny" to advocate the annexation of Texas and Oregon.

O'Sullivan was an influential advocate for Jacksonian democracy, described by Julian Hawthorne as "always full of grand and world-embracing schemes". O'Sullivan wrote an article in 1839 that, while not using the term "manifest destiny", did predict a "divine destiny" for the United States based upon values such as equality, rights of conscience, and personal enfranchisement "to establish on earth the moral dignity and salvation of man". This destiny was not explicitly territorial, but O'Sullivan predicted that the United States would be one of a "Union of many Republics" sharing those values.

Six years later, in 1845, O'Sullivan wrote another essay titled "Annexation" in the Democratic Review, in which he first used the phrase manifest destiny. In this article, he urged the U.S. to annex the Republic of Texas, not only because Texas desired this, but because it was "our manifest destiny to overspread the continent allotted by Providence for the free development of our yearly multiplying millions". Overcoming Whig opposition, Democrats annexed Texas in 1845. O'Sullivan's first usage of the phrase "manifest destiny" attracted little attention.

O'Sullivan's second use of the phrase became extremely influential. On December 27, 1845, in his newspaper the New York Morning News, O'Sullivan addressed the ongoing boundary dispute with Britain. O'Sullivan argued that the United States had the right to claim "the whole of Oregon":

And that claim is by the right of our manifest destiny to overspread and to possess the whole of the continent which Providence has given us for the development of the great experiment of liberty and federated self-government entrusted to us.

That is, O'Sullivan believed that Providence had given the United States a mission to spread republican democracy ("the great experiment of liberty"). Because the British government would not spread democracy, thought O'Sullivan, British claims to the territory should be overruled. O'Sullivan believed that manifest destiny was a moral ideal (a "higher law") that superseded other considerations.

O'Sullivan's original conception of manifest destiny was not a call for territorial expansion by force. He believed that the expansion of the United States would happen without the direction of the U.S. government or the involvement of the military. After Americans immigrated to new regions, they would set up new democratic governments, and then seek admission to the United States, as Texas had done. In 1845, O'Sullivan predicted that California would follow this pattern next, and that even Canada would eventually request annexation as well. He was critical of the Mexican–American War in 1846, although he came to believe that the outcome would be beneficial to both countries.

Ironically, O'Sullivan's term became popular only after it was criticized by Whig opponents of the Polk administration. Whigs denounced manifest destiny, arguing, "that the designers and supporters of schemes of conquest, to be carried on by this government, are engaged in treason to our Constitution and Declaration of Rights, giving aid and comfort to the enemies of republicanism, in that they are advocating and preaching the doctrine of the right of conquest". On January 3, 1846, in a speech Representative Robert Winthrop used the term for the first time in Congress stating:

There is one element in our title [to Oregon], however, which I confess that I have not named, and to which I may not have done entire justice. I mean that new revelation of right which has been designated as the right of our manifest destiny to spread over this whole continent. It has been openly avowed in a leading Administration journal that this, after all, is our best and strongest title-one so clear, so pre-eminent, and so indisputable, that if Great Britain had all our other titles in addition to her own, they would weigh nothing against it. The right of our manifest destiny! There is a right for a new chapter in the law of nations; or rather, in the special laws of our own country; for I suppose the right of a manifest destiny to spread will not be admitted to exist in any nation except the universal Yankee nation!

" Winthrop was the first in a long line of critics who suggested that advocates of manifest destiny were citing "Divine Providence" for justification of actions that were motivated by chauvinism and self-interest. Despite this criticism, expansionists embraced the phrase, which caught on so quickly that its origin was soon forgotten.

== Themes and influences ==
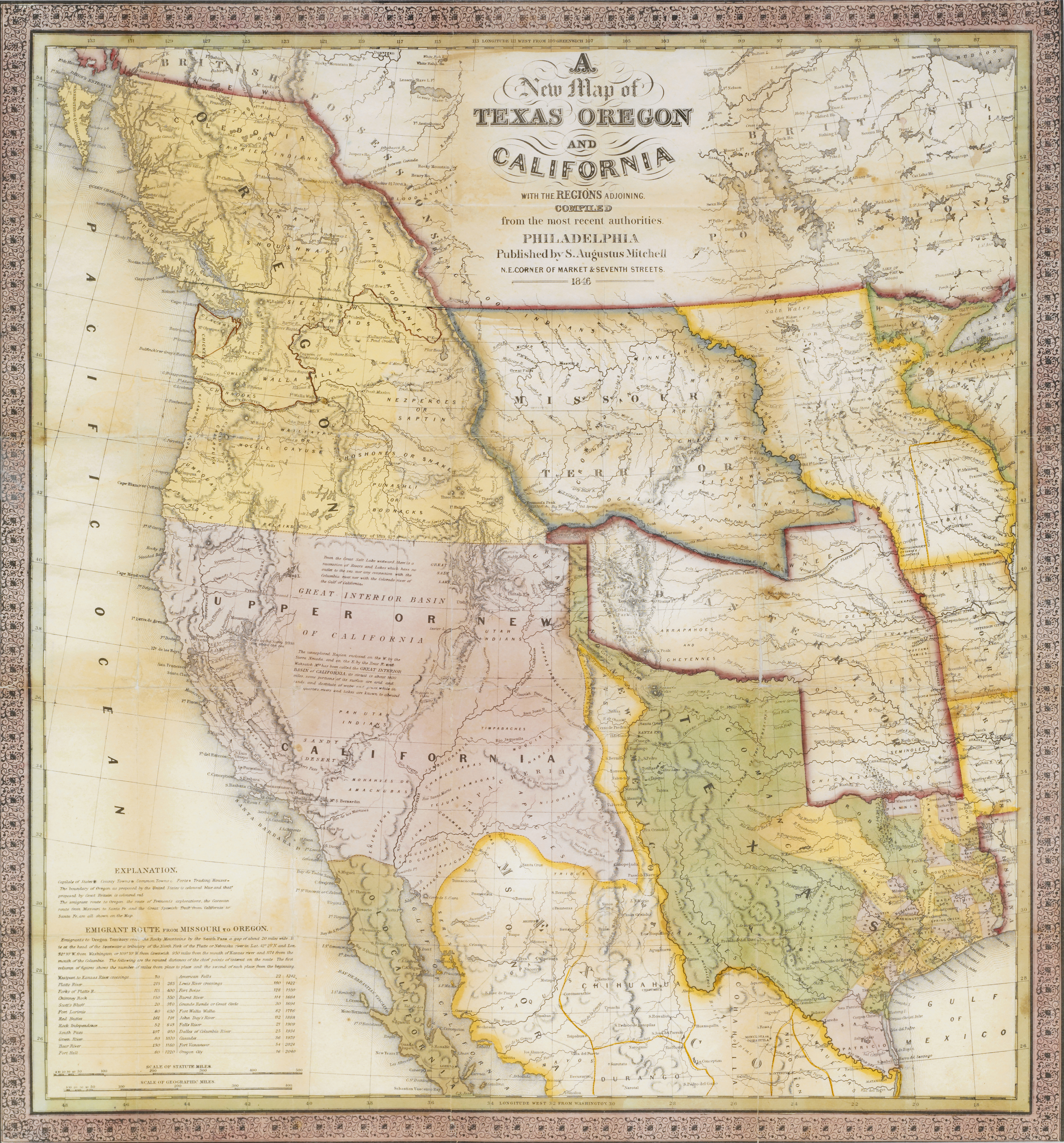
A New Map of Texas, Oregon, and California, Samuel Augustus Mitchell, 1846

Historian Frederick Merk wrote in 1963 that the concept of manifest destiny was born out of "a sense of mission to redeem the Old World by high example ... generated by the potentialities of a new earth for building a new heaven". Merk also states that manifest destiny was a heavily contested concept within the nation:

From the outset Manifest Destiny—vast in program, in its sense of continentalism—was slight in support. It lacked national, sectional, or party following commensurate with its magnitude. The reason was it did not reflect the national spirit. The thesis that it embodied nationalism, found in much historical writing, is backed by little real supporting evidence.

A possible influence is racial predominance, namely the idea that the American Anglo-Saxon race was "separate, innately superior" and "destined to bring good government, commercial prosperity and Christianity to the American continents and the world". Author Reginald Horsman wrote in 1981 that this view also held that "inferior races were doomed to subordinate status or extinction" and that this was used to justify "the enslavement of the blacks and the expulsion and possible extermination of the Indians".

The origin of the first theme, later known as American exceptionalism, was often traced to America's Puritan heritage, particularly John Winthrop's famous "City upon a Hill" sermon of 1630, in which he called for the establishment of a virtuous community that would be a shining example to the Old World. In his influential 1776 pamphlet Common Sense, Thomas Paine echoed this notion, arguing that the American Revolution provided an opportunity to create a new, better society:

We have it in our power to begin the world over again. A situation, similar to the present, hath not happened since the days of Noah until now. The birthday of a new world is at hand...

Many Americans agreed with Paine, and came to believe that the United States' virtue was a result of its special experiment in freedom and democracy. Thomas Jefferson, in a letter to James Monroe, wrote, "it is impossible not to look forward to distant times when our rapid multiplication will expand itself beyond those limits, and cover the whole northern, if not the southern continent." In an 1823 letter to Monroe, Jefferson described the potential annexation of Cuba as "the most interesting addition which could ever be made to our system of states." To Americans in the decades that followed their proclaimed freedom for mankind, embodied in the Declaration of Independence, could only be described as the inauguration of "a new time scale" because the world would look back and define history as events that took place before, and after, the Declaration of Independence. It followed that Americans owed to the world an obligation to expand and preserve these beliefs.

The second theme's origination is less precise. A popular expression of America's mission was elaborated by President Abraham Lincoln's description in his December 1, 1862, message to Congress. He described the United States as "the last, best hope of Earth". The "mission" of the United States was further elaborated during Lincoln's Gettysburg Address, in which he interpreted the American Civil War as a struggle to determine if any nation with democratic ideals could survive; this has been called by historian Robert Johannsen "the most enduring statement of America's Manifest Destiny and mission".

The third theme can be viewed as a natural outgrowth of the belief that God had a direct influence in the foundation and further actions of the United States. Political scientist and historian Clinton Rossiter described this view as summing "that God, at the proper stage in the march of history, called forth certain hardy souls from the old and privilege-ridden nations ... and that in bestowing his grace He also bestowed a peculiar responsibility". Americans presupposed that they were not only divinely elected to maintain the North American continent, but also to "spread abroad the fundamental principles stated in the Bill of Rights". In many cases, this meant neighboring colonial holdings and countries were seen as obstacles rather than the destiny God had provided the United States.

Faragher's 1997 analysis of the political polarization between the Democratic Party and the Whig Party is that:

Most Democrats were wholehearted supporters of expansion, whereas many Whigs (especially in the North) were opposed. Whigs welcomed most of the changes wrought by industrialization but advocated strong government policies that would guide growth and development within the country's existing boundaries; they feared (correctly) that expansion raised a contentious issue, the extension of slavery to the territories. On the other hand, many Democrats feared industrialization the Whigs welcomed... For many Democrats, the answer to the nation's social ills was to continue to follow Thomas Jefferson's vision of establishing agriculture in the new territories to counterbalance industrialization.

Two Native American writers have recently tried to link some of the themes of manifest destiny to the original ideology of the 15th-century decree of the Doctrine of Christian Discovery. Nick Estes (a Lakota) links the 15th-century Catholic doctrine of distinguishing Christians from non-Christians in the expansion of European nations. Estes and international jurist Tonya Gonnella Frichner (of the Onondaga Nation) further link the doctrine of discovery to Johnson v. McIntosh and frame their arguments on the correlation between manifest destiny and Doctrine of Christian Discovery by using the statement made by Chief Justice John Marshall during the case, as he "spelled out the rights of the United states to Indigenous lands" and drew upon the Doctrine of Christian Discovery for his statement. Marshall ruled that "indigenous peoples possess 'occupancy' rights, meaning their lands could be taken by the powers of 'discovery'". Frichner explains that "The newly formed United States needed to manufacture an American Indian political identity and concept of Indian land that would open the way for united states and westward colonial expansion." In this way, manifest destiny was inspired by the original European colonization of the Americas, and it excuses U.S. violence against Indigenous Nations.

According to historian Dorceta Taylor: "Minorities are not usually chronicled as explorers or environmental activists, yet the historical records show that they were a part of expeditions, resided and worked on the frontier, founded towns, and were educators and entrepreneurs. In short, people of color were very important actors in westward expansion."

The desire for trade with China and other Asian countries was another ground for expansionism, with Americans seeing prospects of westward contact with Asia as fulfilling long-held Western hopes of finding new routes to Asia, and perceiving the Pacific as less unruly and dominated by Old World conflicts than the Atlantic and therefore a more inviting area for the new nation to expand its influence in.

== Debate over manifest destiny ==
With the Louisiana Purchase in 1803, which doubled the size of the United States, Thomas Jefferson set the stage for the continental expansion of the United States. Many began to see this as the beginning of a new providential mission: If the United States was successful as a "shining city upon a hill", people in other countries would seek to establish their own democratic republics. Not all Americans or their political leaders believed that the United States was a divinely favored nation, or thought that it ought to expand. For example, many Whigs opposed territorial expansion based on the Democratic claim that the United States was destined to serve as a virtuous example to the rest of the world, and also had a divine obligation to spread its superordinate political system and a way of life throughout North American continent. Many in the Whig party "were fearful of spreading out too widely", and they "adhered to the concentration of national authority in a limited area". In July 1848, Alexander Stephens denounced President Polk's expansionist interpretation of America's future as "mendacious".

In the mid‑19th century, expansionism, especially southward toward Cuba, also faced opposition from those Americans who were trying to abolish slavery. As more territory was added to the United States in the following decades, "extending the area of freedom" in the minds of Southerners also meant extending the institution of slavery. That is why slavery became one of the central issues in the continental expansion of the United States before the Civil War.

Before and during the Civil War, both sides claimed that America's destiny was rightfully their own. Abraham Lincoln opposed anti-immigrant nativism, and the imperialism of manifest destiny as both unjust and unreasonable. He objected to the Mexican war and believed each of these disordered forms of patriotism threatened the inseparable moral and fraternal bonds of liberty and union that he sought to perpetuate through a patriotic love of country guided by wisdom and critical self-awareness. Lincoln's "Eulogy to Henry Clay", June 6, 1852, provides the most cogent expression of his reflective patriotism.

Ulysses S. Grant served in the war with Mexico and later wrote:

I was bitterly opposed to the measure [to annex Texas], and to this day regard the war [with Mexico] which resulted as one of the most unjust ever waged by a stronger against a weaker nation. It was an instance of a republic following the bad example of European monarchies, in not considering justice in their desire to acquire additional territory ... The Southern rebellion was largely the outgrowth of the Mexican war. Nations, like individuals, are punished for their transgressions. We got our punishment in the most sanguinary and expensive war of modern times.

== Era of expansion ==
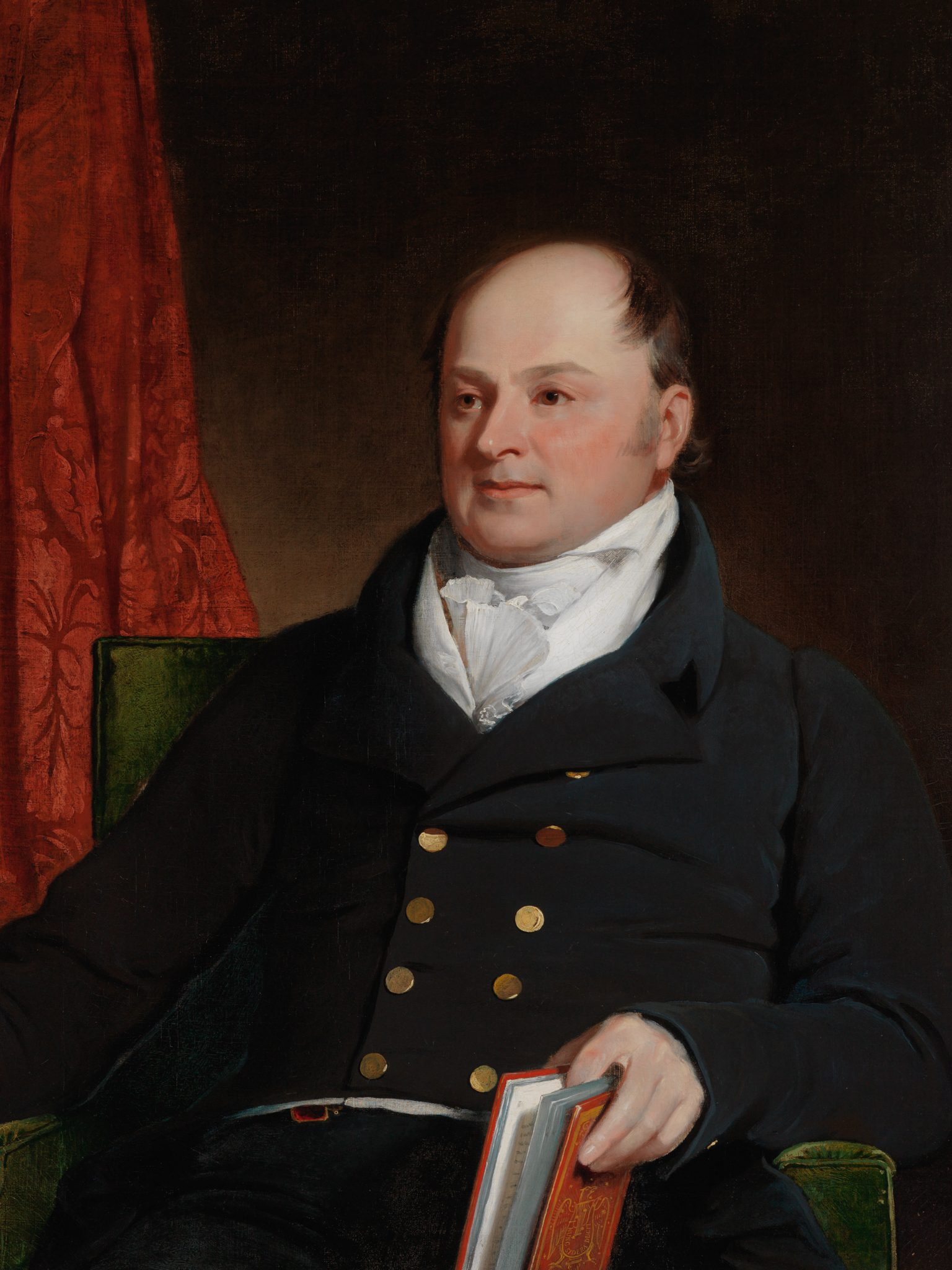
John Quincy Adams, painted above in 1816 by Charles Robert Leslie, was an early proponent of continentalism. Late in life, he came to regret his role in helping U.S. slavery to expand, and became a leading opponent of the annexation of Texas.

The phrase "manifest destiny" is most associated with the territorial expansion of the United States from 1803 to 1900. However, the Vermont Republic joined the United States in 1791, the territory of American Samoa grew larger in 1904 and 1925, and the U.S. acquired what is now the United States Virgin Islands in 1917 and what was the United Nations Trust Territory of the Pacific Islands in 1947. Of that Trust Territory, the Northern Mariana Islands joined the United States in 1986, while the Federated States of Micronesia, Republic of the Marshall Islands, and Palau became independent states in a Compact of Free Association with the U.S.

Some scholars limit the "manifest destiny" period to solely North American continental expansion from the Louisiana Purchase to the acquisition of Alaska in 1867, sometimes called the "age of manifest destiny". During this time, the United States expanded to the Pacific Ocean—"from sea to shining sea"—largely defining the borders of the continental United States as they are today. In the 1890s, the United States expanded into Polynesia and Asia with the annexation of the Republic of Hawaii, the Philippines, Guam, and American Samoa.

=== War of 1812 ===
One of the goals of the War of 1812 was to threaten to annex the British colony of Lower Canada as a bargaining chip to force the British to abandon support for the various Native American tribes residing there. The result of this overoptimism was a series of defeats in 1812 in part due to the wide use of poorly trained state militias rather than regular troops. The American victories at the Battle of Lake Erie and the Battle of the Thames in 1813 ended the Indian raids and removed the main reason for threatening annexation. To end the War of 1812, John Quincy Adams, Henry Clay and Albert Gallatin (former treasury secretary and a leading expert on Indians) and the other American diplomats negotiated the Treaty of Ghent in 1814 with Britain. They rejected the British plan to set up an Indian state in U.S. territory south of the Great Lakes. They explained the American policy toward acquisition of Indian lands:

The United States, while intending never to acquire lands from the Indians otherwise than peaceably, and with their free consent, are fully determined, in that manner, progressively, and in proportion as their growing population may require, to reclaim from the state of nature, and to bring into cultivation every portion of the territory contained within their acknowledged boundaries. In thus providing for the support of millions of civilized beings, they will not violate any dictate of justice or of humanity; for they will not only give to the few thousand savages scattered over that territory an ample equivalent for any right they may surrender, but will always leave them the possession of lands more than they can cultivate, and more than adequate to their subsistence, comfort, and enjoyment, by cultivation. If this be a spirit of aggrandizement, the undersigned are prepared to admit, in that sense, its existence; but they must deny that it affords the slightest proof of an intention not to respect the boundaries between them and European nations, or of a desire to encroach upon the territories of Great Britain... They will not suppose that that Government will avow, as the basis of their policy towards the United States a system of arresting their natural growth within their own territories, for the sake of preserving a perpetual desert for savages.

A shocked Henry Goulburn, one of the British negotiators at Ghent, remarked, after coming to understand the American position on taking the Indians' land:

Till I came here, I had no idea of the fixed determination which there is in the heart of every American to extirpate the Indians and appropriate their territory.

=== Continentalism ===
The 19th-century belief that the United States would eventually encompass all of North America is known as "continentalism". An early proponent of this idea, John Quincy Adams became a leading figure in U.S. expansion between the Louisiana Purchase in 1803 and the Polk administration in the 1840s. In 1811, Adams wrote to his father:

The whole continent of North America appears to be destined by Divine Providence to be peopled by one nation, speaking one language, professing one general system of religious and political principles, and accustomed to one general tenor of social usages and customs. For the common happiness of them all, for their peace and prosperity, I believe it is indispensable that they should be associated in one federal Union.

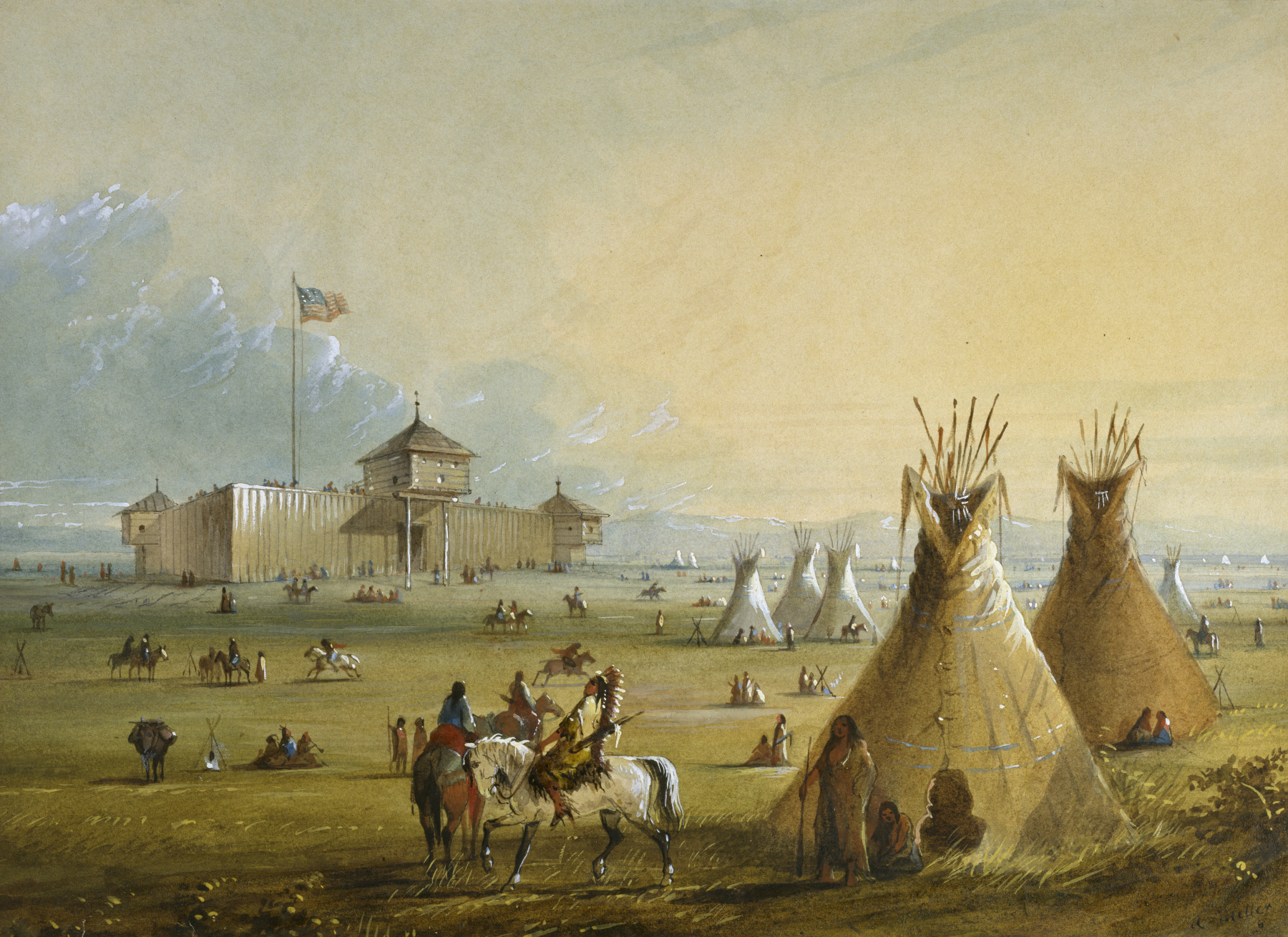
The first Fort Laramie as it looked prior to 1840. Painting from memory by Alfred Jacob Miller

Adams did much to further this idea. He orchestrated the Treaty of 1818, which established the border between British North America and the United States as far west as the Rocky Mountains, and provided for the joint occupation of the region known in American history as the Oregon Country and in British and Canadian history as the New Caledonia and Columbia Districts. He negotiated the Transcontinental Treaty in 1819, transferring Florida from Spain to the United States and extending the U.S. border with Spanish Mexico all the way to the Pacific Ocean. And he formulated the Monroe Doctrine of 1823, which warned Europe that the Western Hemisphere was no longer open for European colonization.

The Monroe Doctrine and "manifest destiny" formed a closely related nexus of principles: historian Walter McDougall calls manifest destiny a corollary of the Monroe Doctrine, because while the Monroe Doctrine did not specify expansion, expansion was necessary in order to enforce the doctrine. Concerns in the United States that European powers were seeking to acquire colonies or greater influence in North America led to calls for expansion in order to prevent this. In his influential 1935 study of manifest destiny, done in conjunction with the Walter Hines Page School of International Relations, Albert Weinberg wrote: "the expansionism of the [1830s] arose as a defensive effort to forestall the encroachment of Europe in North America".

==== Transcontinental railroad ====
The Pacific Railway Act of 1862, signed by President Abraham Lincoln, awarded land grants and subsidies to the Union Pacific and Central Pacific railroad companies to build the transcontinental line. Thousands of Chinese and Irish immigrants labored under harsh conditions to complete the railway, which was finished on May 10, 1869, when a golden spike was driven at Promontory, Utah.

Manifest destiny played an important role in the development of the transcontinental railroad. The transcontinental railroad system is often used in manifest destiny imagery like John Gast's painting, American Progress, where multiple locomotives are seen traveling west. According to academic Dina Gilio-Whitaker, "the transcontinental railroads not only enabled [U.S. control over the continent] but also accelerated it exponentially." Historian Boyd Cothran says that "modern transportation development and abundant resource exploitation gave rise to an appropriation of indigenous land, [and] resources."

==== All Oregon ====
Manifest destiny played its most important role in the Oregon boundary dispute between the United States and Britain, when the phrase "manifest destiny" originated. The Anglo-American Convention of 1818 had provided for the joint occupation of the Oregon Country, and thousands of Americans migrated there in the 1840s over the Oregon Trail. The British rejected a proposal by U.S. President John Tyler (in office 1841–1845) to divide the region along the 49th parallel, and instead proposed a boundary line farther south, along the Columbia River, which would have made most of what later became the state of Washington part of their colonies in North America. Advocates of manifest destiny protested and called for the annexation of the entire Oregon Country up to the Alaska line (54°40ʹ N). Presidential candidate Polk used this popular outcry to his advantage, and the Democrats called for the annexation of "All Oregon" in the 1844 U.S. presidential election.

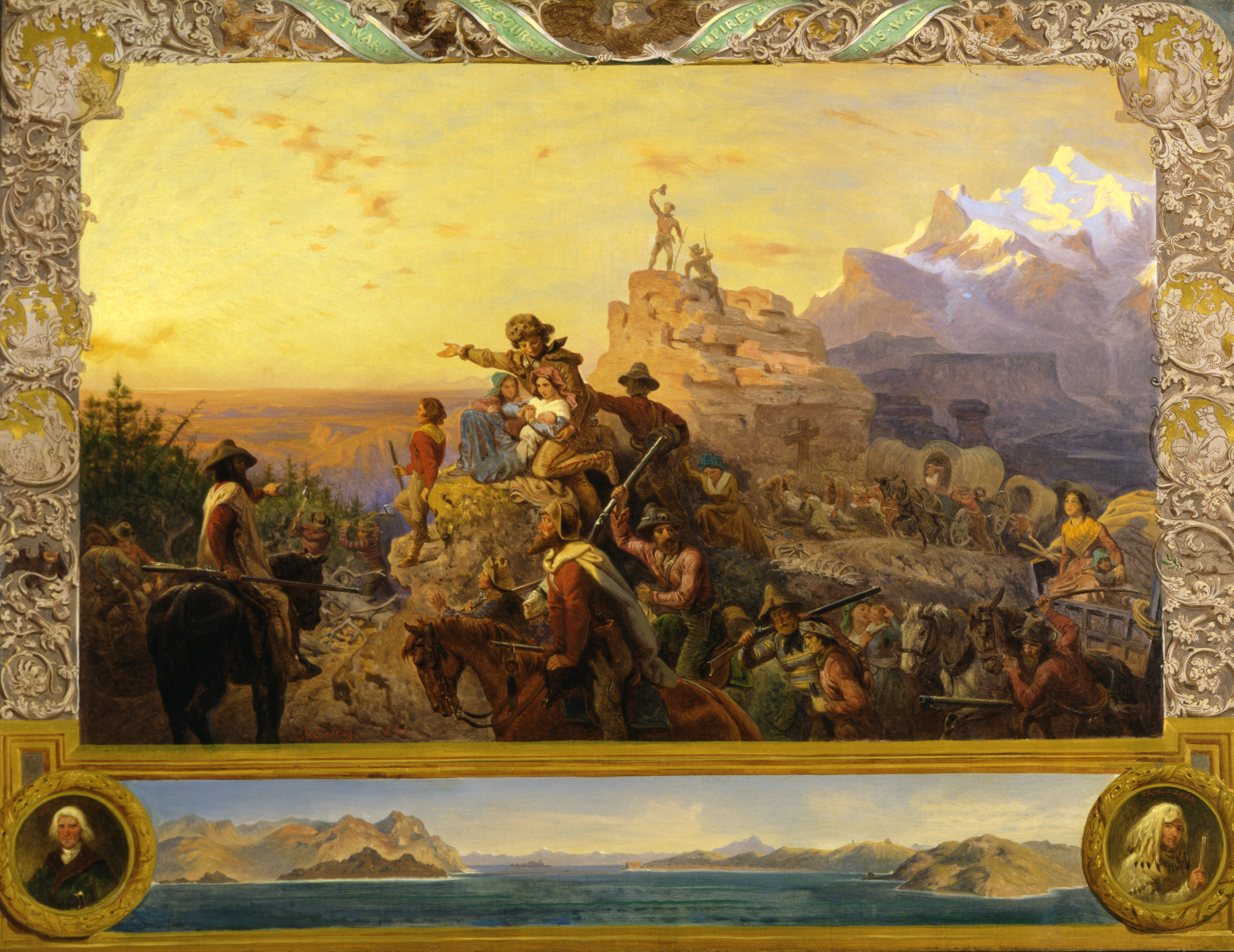
American westward expansion is idealized in Emanuel Leutze's famous painting Westward the Course of Empire Takes Its Way (1861).

As president, Polk sought compromise and renewed the earlier offer to divide the territory in half along the 49th parallel, to the dismay of the most ardent advocates of manifest destiny. When the British refused the offer, American expansionists responded with slogans such as "The whole of Oregon or none" and "Fifty-four forty or fight", referring to the northern border of the region. (The latter slogan is often mistakenly described as having been a part of the 1844 presidential campaign.) When Polk moved to terminate the joint occupation agreement, the British finally agreed in early 1846 to divide the region along the 49th parallel, leaving the lower Columbia basin as part of the United States. In order to ensure that Britain retained all of Vancouver Island and the southern Gulf Islands, however, it was agreed that the border would swing south around that area. The Oregon Treaty of 1846 formally settled the dispute; Polk's administration succeeded in selling the treaty to Congress because the United States was about to begin the Mexican–American War, and the president and others argued it would be foolish to also fight the British Empire.

Despite the earlier clamor for "All Oregon", the Oregon Treaty was popular in the United States and was easily ratified by the Senate. The most fervent advocates of manifest destiny had not prevailed along the northern border because, according to Reginald Stuart, "the compass of manifest destiny pointed west and southwest, not north, despite the use of the term 'continentalism'".

In 1869, American historian Frances Fuller Victor published Manifest Destiny in the West in the Overland Monthly, arguing that the efforts of early American fur traders and missionaries presaged American control of Oregon. She concluded the article as follows:

It was an oversight on the part of the United States, the giving up the island of Quadra and Vancouver, on the settlement of the boundary question. Yet, "what is to be, will be", as some realist has it; and we look for the restoration of that picturesque and rocky atom of our former territory as inevitable.

=== Mexico and Texas ===
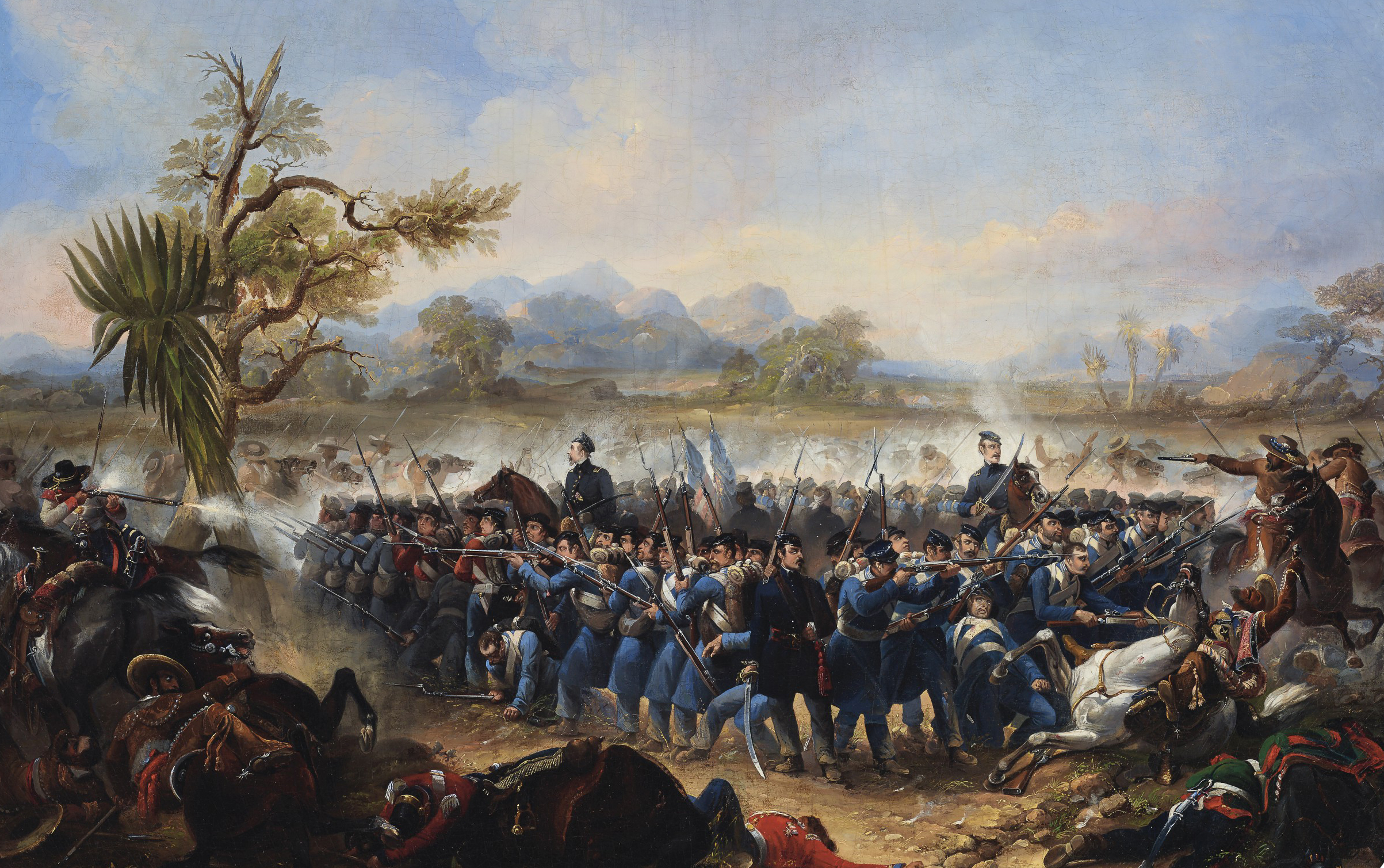
The Battle of Río San Gabriel was a decisive battle action of the Mexican–American War (1846–1848) as part of the U.S. conquest of California.

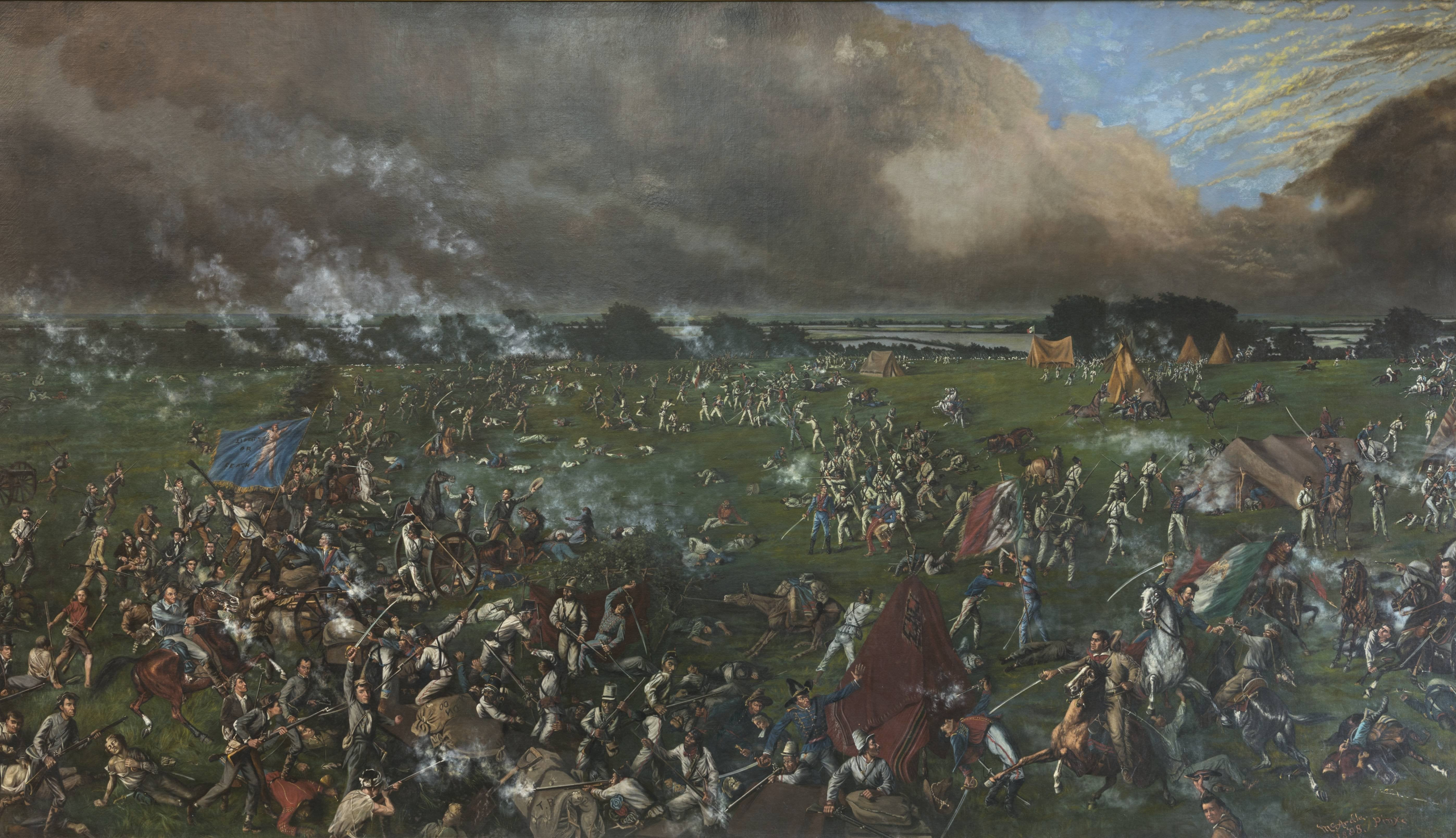
The Battle of San Jacinto was the final battle during the Texas Revolution (1835–1836) which resulted in a decisive victory for the Texian army.

Manifest destiny played an important role in the expansion of Texas and American relationship with Mexico. In 1836, the Republic of Texas declared independence from Mexico and, after the Texas Revolution, sought to join the United States as a new state. This was an idealized process of expansion that had been advocated from Jefferson to O'Sullivan: newly democratic and independent states would request entry into the United States, rather than the United States extending its government over people who did not want it. The annexation of Texas was attacked by anti-slavery spokesmen because it would add another slave state to the Union. Presidents Andrew Jackson and Martin Van Buren declined Texas's offer to join the United States in part because the slavery issue threatened to divide the Democratic Party.

Before the election of 1844, Whig candidate Henry Clay and the presumed Democratic candidate, former president, Van Buren, both declared themselves opposed to the annexation of Texas, each hoping to keep the troublesome topic from becoming a campaign issue. This unexpectedly led to Van Buren being dropped by the Democrats in favor of Polk, who favored annexation. Polk tied the Texas annexation question with the Oregon dispute, thus providing a sort of regional compromise on expansion. (Expansionists in the North were more inclined to promote the occupation of Oregon, while Southern expansionists focused primarily on the annexation of Texas.) Although elected by a very slim margin, Polk proceeded as if his victory had been a mandate for expansion.

==== All of Mexico ====
After the election of Polk, but before he took office, Congress approved the annexation of Texas. Polk moved to occupy a portion of Texas that had declared independence from Mexico in 1836, but was still claimed by Mexico. This paved the way for the outbreak of the Mexican–American War on April 24, 1846. With American successes on the battlefield, by the summer of 1847, there were calls for the annexation of "All Mexico", particularly among Eastern Democrats, who argued that bringing Mexico into the Union was the best way to ensure future peace in the region.

This was a controversial proposition for two reasons. First, idealistic advocates of manifest destiny like O'Sullivan had always maintained that the laws of the United States should not be imposed on people against their will. The annexation of "All Mexico" would be a violation of this principle. And secondly, the annexation of Mexico was controversial because it would mean extending U.S. citizenship to millions of Mexicans, who belonged to a racially mixed population and adhered primarily to Roman Catholicism. Senator John C. Calhoun of South Carolina, who had approved of the annexation of Texas, was opposed to the annexation of Mexico, as well as the "mission" aspect of manifest destiny, for racial reasons. He made these views clear in a speech to Congress on January 4, 1848:

We have never dreamt of incorporating into our Union any but the Caucasian race—the free white race. To incorporate Mexico, would be the very first instance of the kind, of incorporating an Indian race; for more than half of the Mexicans are Indians, and the other is composed chiefly of mixed tribes. I protest against such a union as that! Ours, sir, is the Government of a white race.... We are anxious to force free government on all; and I see that it has been urged ... that it is the mission of this country to spread civil and religious liberty over all the world, and especially over this continent. It is a great mistake.

This debate brought to the forefront one of the contradictions of manifest destiny: on the one hand, while identitarian ideas inherent in manifest destiny suggested that Mexicans, as non-whites, would present a threat to white racial integrity and thus were not qualified to become Americans, the "mission" component of manifest destiny suggested that Mexicans would be improved (or "regenerated", as it was then described) by bringing them into American democracy. Identitarianism was used to promote manifest destiny, but, as in the case of Calhoun and the resistance to the "All Mexico" movement, identitarianism was also used to oppose manifest destiny. Conversely, proponents of annexation of "All Mexico" regarded it as an anti-slavery measure.

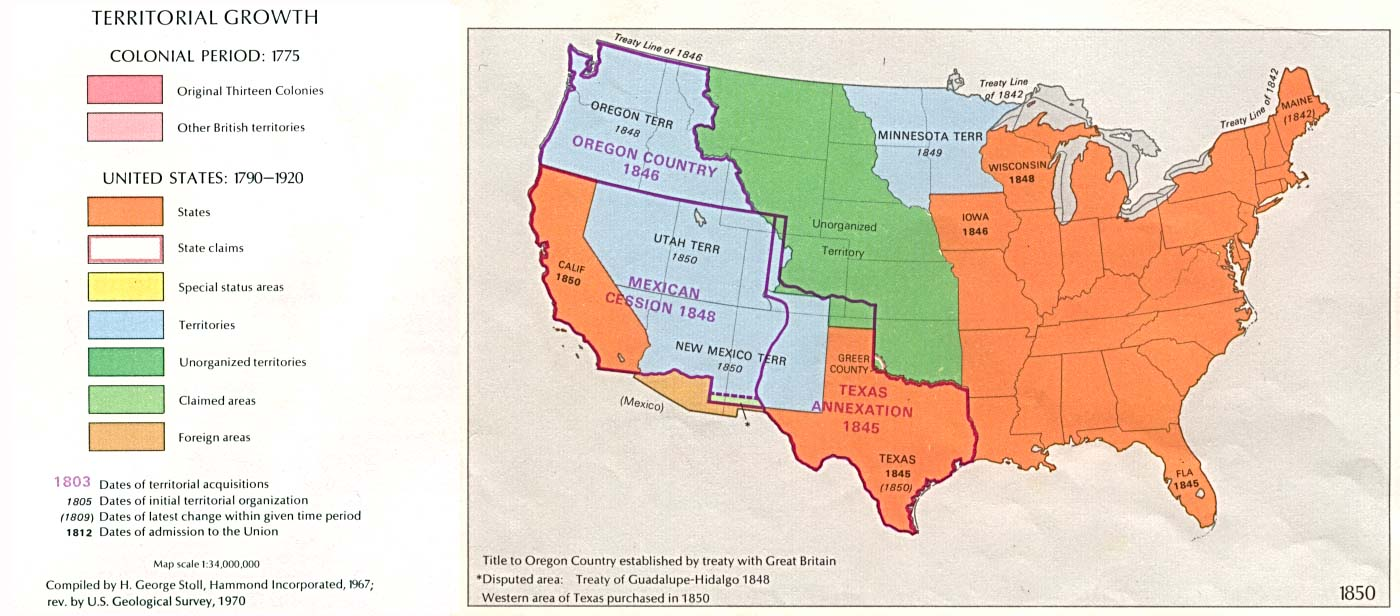
Growth from 1840 to 1850

The controversy was eventually ended by the Mexican Cession, which added the territories of Alta California and Nuevo México to the United States, both more sparsely populated than the rest of Mexico. Like the "All Oregon" movement, the "All Mexico" movement quickly abated.

Historian Frederick Merk, in Manifest Destiny and Mission in American History: A Reinterpretation (1963), argued that the failure of the "All Oregon" and "All Mexico" movements indicates that manifest destiny had not been as popular as historians have traditionally portrayed it to have been. Merk wrote that, while belief in the beneficent mission of democracy was central to American history, aggressive "continentalism" were aberrations supported by only a minority of Americans, all of them Democrats. Some Democrats were also opposed; the Democrats of Louisiana opposed annexation of Mexico, while those in Mississippi supported it.

These events related to the Mexican–American War and had an effect on the American people living in the Southern Plains at the time. A case study by David Beyreis depicts these effects through the operations of a fur trading and Indian trading business named Bent, St. Vrain and Company during the period. The telling of this company shows that the idea of Manifest Destiny was not unanimously loved by all Americans and did not always benefit Americans. The case study goes on to show that this company could have ceased to exist in the name of territorial expansion.

=== Filibusterism ===
After the Mexican–American War ended in 1848, disagreements over the expansion of slavery made further annexation by conquest too divisive to be official government policy. Some, such as John Quitman, Governor of Mississippi, offered what public support they could. In one memorable case, Quitman simply explained that the state of Mississippi had "lost" its state arsenal, which began showing up in the hands of filibusters. Yet these isolated cases only solidified opposition in the North as many Northerners were increasingly opposed to what they believed to be efforts by Southern slave owners—and their friends in the North—to expand slavery through filibustering. Sarah P. Remond on January 24, 1859, delivered an impassioned speech at Warrington, England, that the connection between filibustering and slave power was clear proof of "the mass of corruption that underlay the whole system of American government". The Wilmot Proviso and the continued "Slave Power" narratives thereafter, indicated the degree to which manifest destiny had become part of the sectional controversy.

Without official government support, the most radical advocates of manifest destiny increasingly turned to military filibustering. Originally filibuster had come from the Dutch vrijbuiter and referred to buccaneers in the West Indies that preyed on Spanish commerce. While there had been some filibustering expeditions into Canada in the late 1830s, only by mid-century did filibuster become a definitive term. By then, declared the New-York Daily Times "the fever of Fillibusterism is on our country. Her pulse beats like a hammer at the wrist, and there's a very high color on her face." Millard Fillmore's second annual message to Congress, submitted in December 1851, gave double the amount of space to filibustering activities than the brewing sectional conflict. The eagerness of the filibusters, and the public to support them, had an international hue. Clay's son, a diplomat in Portugal, reported that the invasion created a sensation in Lisbon.

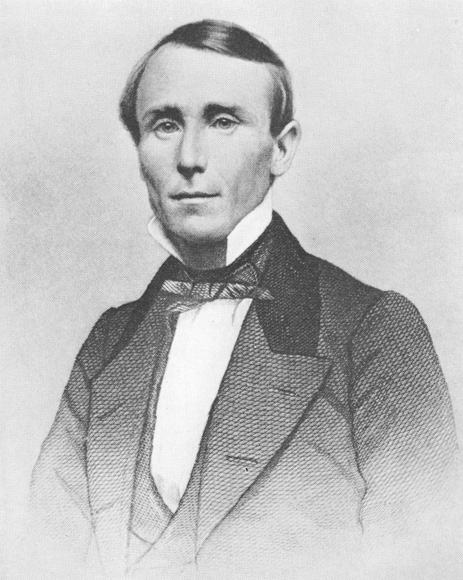
Filibuster William Walker, who launched several expeditions to Mexico and Central America, ruled Nicaragua, and was captured by the Royal Navy before being executed in Honduras by the Honduran government.

Although they were illegal, filibustering operations in the late 1840s and early 1850s were romanticized in the United States. The Democratic Party's national platform included a plank that specifically endorsed William Walker's filibustering in Nicaragua. Wealthy American expansionists financed dozens of expeditions, usually based out of New Orleans, New York, and San Francisco. The primary target of manifest destiny's filibusters was Latin America but there were isolated incidents elsewhere. Mexico was a favorite target of organizations devoted to filibustering, like the Knights of the Golden Circle. William Walker got his start as a filibuster in an ill-advised attempt to separate the Mexican states Sonora and Baja California. Narciso López, a near second in fame and success, spent his efforts trying to secure Cuba from the Spanish Empire.

The United States had long been interested in acquiring Cuba from the declining Spanish Empire. As with Texas, Oregon, and California, American policy makers were concerned that Cuba would fall into British hands, which, according to the thinking of the Monroe Doctrine, would constitute a threat to the interests of the United States. Prompted by O'Sullivan, President Polk offered to buy Cuba from Spain in 1848 for $100 million. Polk feared that filibustering would hurt his effort to buy the island, and so he informed the Spanish of an attempt by the Cuban filibuster López to seize Cuba by force and annex it to the United States, foiling the plot. Spain declined to sell the island, which ended Polk's efforts to acquire Cuba. O'Sullivan eventually landed in legal trouble.

Filibustering continued to be a major concern for presidents after Polk. Whigs presidents Zachary Taylor and Millard Fillmore tried to suppress the expeditions. When the Democrats recaptured the White House in 1852 with the election of Franklin Pierce, a filibustering effort by John A. Quitman to acquire Cuba received the tentative support of the president. Pierce backed off and instead renewed the offer to buy the island, this time for $130 million. When the public learned of the Ostend Manifesto in 1854, which argued that the United States could seize Cuba by force if Spain refused to sell, this effectively killed the effort to acquire the island. The public now linked expansion with slavery; if manifest destiny had once enjoyed widespread popular approval, this was no longer true.

Filibusters like William Walker continued to garner headlines in the late 1850s but to little effect. Expansionism was among the various issues that played a role in the coming of the war. With the divisive question of the expansion of slavery, Northerners and Southerners, in effect, were coming to define manifest destiny in different ways, undermining nationalism as a unifying force. According to Frederick Merk, "The doctrine of Manifest Destiny, which in the 1840s had seemed Heaven-sent, proved to have been a bomb wrapped up in idealism."

The filibusterism of the era even opened itself up to some mockery among the headlines. In 1854, a San Francisco newspaper published a satirical poem called "Filibustering Ethics". This poem features two characters, Captain Robb and Farmer Cobb. Captain Robb makes claim to Farmer Cobb's land arguing that Robb deserves the land because he is Anglo-Saxon, has weapons to "blow out" Cobb's brains, and nobody has heard of Cobb, so what right does Cobb have to claim the land. Cobb argues that Robb doesn't need his land because Robb already has more land than he knows what to do with. Due to threats of violence, Cobb surrenders his land and leaves grumbling that "might should be the rule of right among enlightened nations."

=== Homestead Act ===
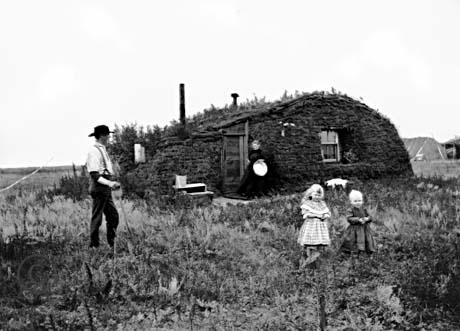
Norwegian settlers in North Dakota in front of their homestead, a sod hut

The Homestead Act of 1862 encouraged 600,000 families to settle the West by giving them land (usually 160 acres) almost free. Over the course of 123 years, 200 million claims were made and over 270 million acres were settled, accounting for 10% of the land in the U.S. They had to live on and improve the land for five years. Before the American Civil War, Southern leaders opposed the Homestead Acts because they feared it would lead to more free states and free territories. After the mass resignation of Southern senators and representatives at the beginning of the war, Congress was subsequently able to pass the Homestead Act.

In some areas, the Homestead Act resulted in the direct removal of Indigenous communities. According to American historian Roxanne Dunbar-Ortiz, all five nations of the "Five Civilized Tribes" signed treaties with the Confederacy and initially supported them in hopes of dividing and weakening the U.S. so that they could remain on their land. The United States Army, led by prominent Civil War generals such as William Tecumseh Sherman, Philip Sheridan, and George Armstrong Custer, waged wars on "non-treaty Indians" who continued to live on land that had already been ceded to the U.S. through treaty. Homesteaders and other settlers soon followed and took possession of the land for farms and mining. Occasionally, white settlers would move ahead of the U.S. Army, into land that had not yet been settled by the United States, causing conflict with the Native people who still resided there. According to Anglo-American historian Julius Wilm, while the U.S. government did not approve of settlers moving ahead of the Army, Indian Affairs officials did believe "the move of frontier whites into the proximity of contested territory—be they homesteaders or parties interested in other pursuits—necessitated the removal of Indigenous nations."

According to historian Hannah Anderson, the Homestead Act also led to environmental degradation. While it succeeded in settling and farming the land, the Act failed to preserve the land. Continuous plowing of the topsoil made the soil vulnerable to erosion and wind, as well as stripping the nutrients from the ground. This deforestation and erosion would play a key role in the Dust Bowl in the 1930s. Intense logging caused a decrease in much of the forests and hunting harmed many of the native animal populations, including the bison, whose population was reduced to a few hundreds.

=== Beyond North America: Annexation of Hawaii ===
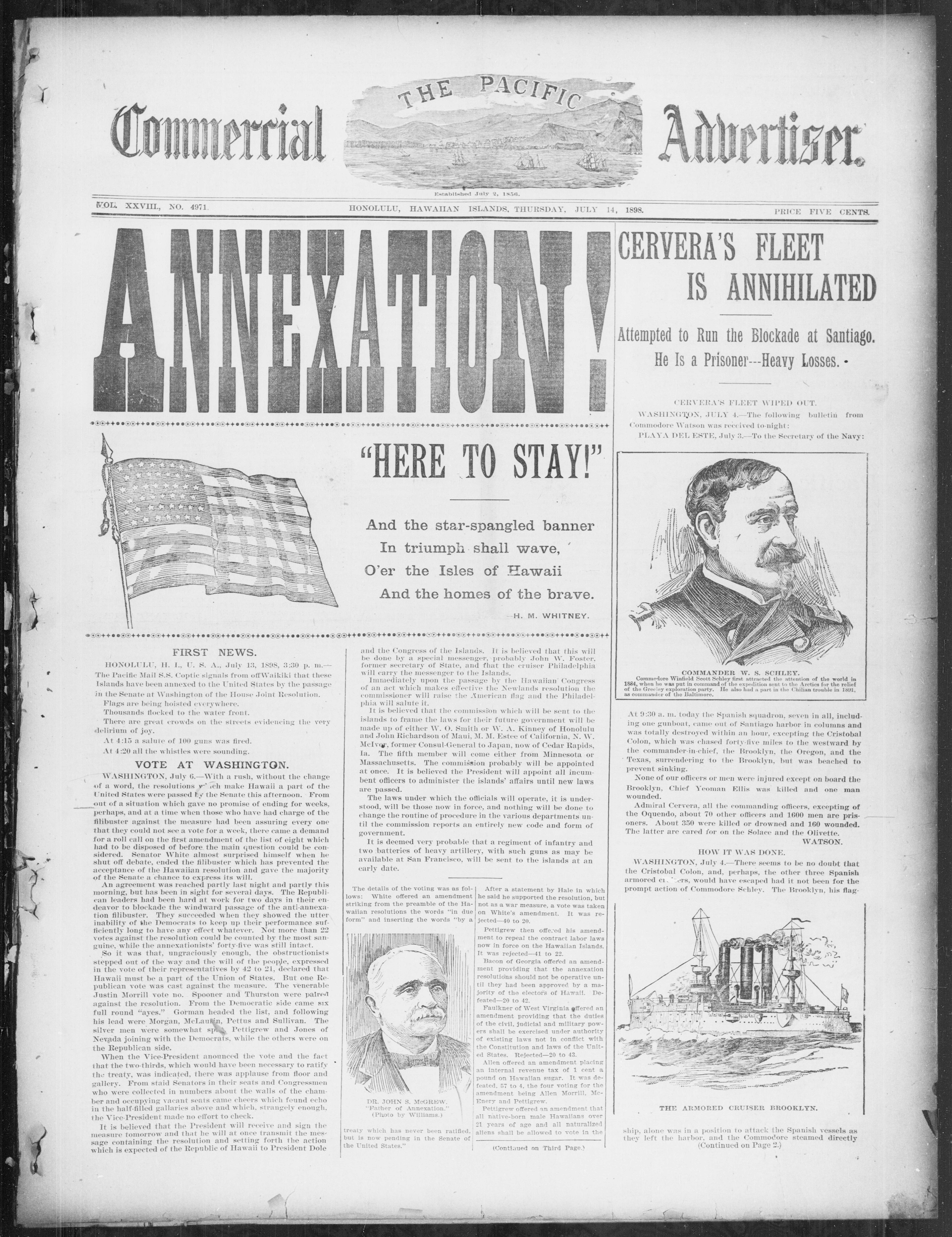
Newspaper reporting the annexation of the Republic of Hawaii in 1898

In 1859, Reuben Davis, a member of the House of Representatives from Mississippi, articulated one of the most expansive visions of manifest destiny on record:

We may expand so as to include the whole world. Mexico, Central America, South America, Cuba, the West India Islands, and even England and France [we] might annex without inconvenience... allowing them with their local Legislatures to regulate their local affairs in their own way. And this, Sir, is the mission of this Republic and its ultimate destiny.

As the Civil War faded into history, the term manifest destiny experienced a brief revival. Protestant missionary Josiah Strong, in his best-seller of 1885, Our Country, argued that the future was devolved upon America since it had perfected the ideals of civil liberty, "a pure spiritual Christianity", and concluded, "My plea is not, Save America for America's sake, but, Save America for the world's sake."

In the 1892 U.S. presidential election, the Republican Party platform proclaimed: "We reaffirm our approval of the Monroe doctrine and believe in the achievement of the manifest destiny of the Republic in its broadest sense." What was meant by "manifest destiny" in this context was not clearly defined, particularly since the Republicans lost the election.

In the 1896 election, the Republicans recaptured the White House and held on to it for the next 16 years. During that time, manifest destiny was cited to promote overseas expansion. Whether this version of manifest destiny was consistent with the continental expansionism of the 1840s was debated at the time, and long afterwards.

For example, when President William McKinley advocated annexation of the Republic of Hawaii in 1898, he said that "We need Hawaii just as much and a good deal more than we did California. It is manifest destiny." On the other hand, former President Grover Cleveland, a Democrat who had blocked the annexation of Hawaii during his administration, wrote that McKinley's annexation of the territory was a "perversion of our national destiny". Historians continued that debate; some have interpreted American acquisition of other Pacific island groups in the 1890s as an extension of manifest destiny across the Pacific Ocean. Others have regarded it as the antithesis of manifest destiny and merely imperialism.

=== Spanish–American War ===
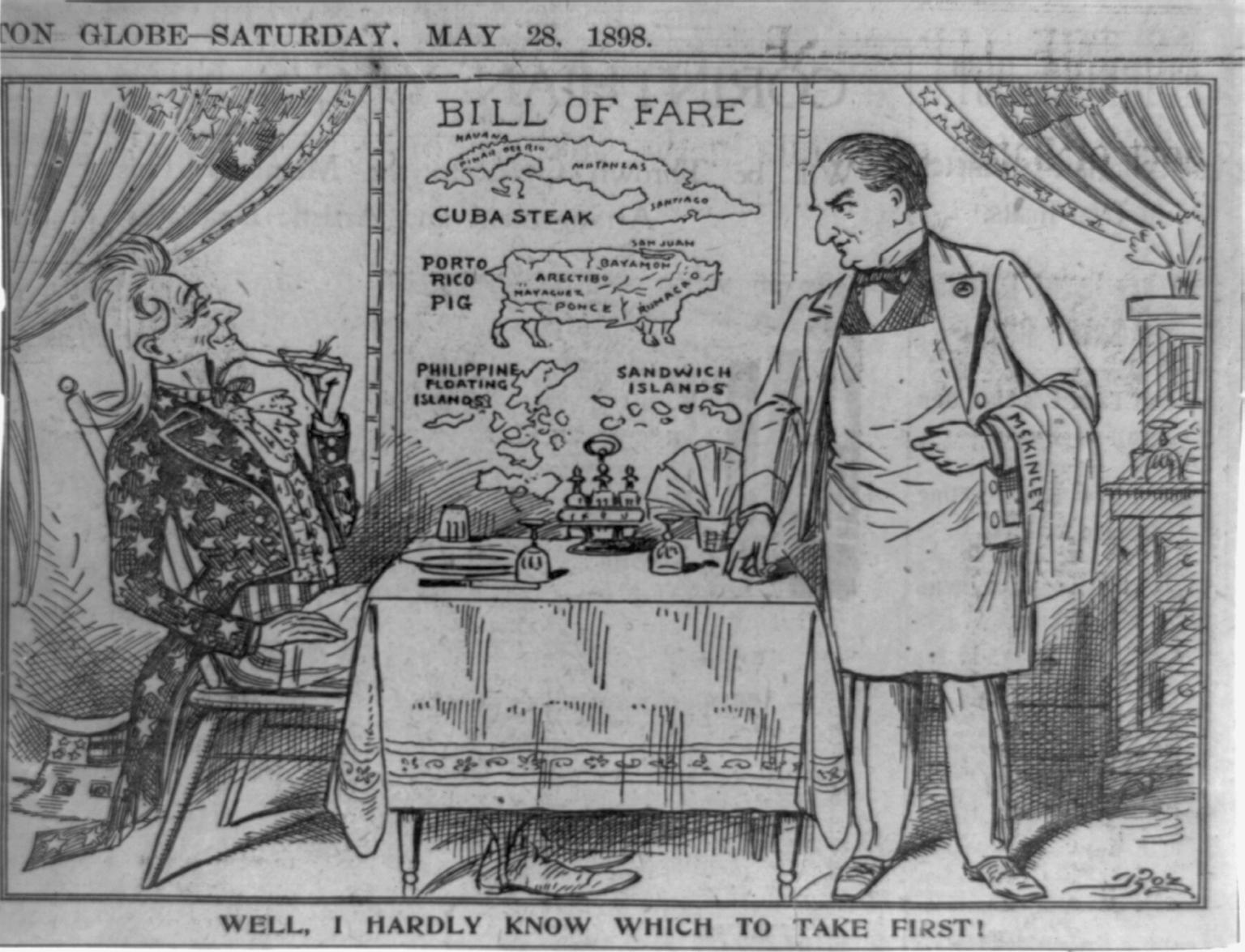
A cartoon of Uncle Sam seated in restaurant looking at the bill of fare containing "Cuba steak", "Porto Rico pig", the "Philippine Islands" and the "Sandwich Islands" (Hawaii)

In 1898, the United States intervened in the Cuban insurrection and launched the Spanish–American War to force Spain out. According to the terms of the Treaty of Paris, Spain relinquished sovereignty over Cuba and ceded the Philippine Islands, Puerto Rico, and Guam to the United States. The terms of cession for the Philippines involved a payment of the sum of $20 million by the United States to Spain. The treaty was highly contentious and denounced by William Jennings Bryan, who tried to make it a central issue in the 1900 election, which he lost to McKinley.

The Teller Amendment, passed unanimously by the U.S. Senate before the war, which proclaimed Cuba "free and independent", forestalled annexation of the island. The Platt Amendment (1902) then established Cuba as a virtual protectorate of the United States.

=== American Samoa ===
The United States, German Empire, and United Kingdom participated in the Tripartite Convention of 1899 at the end of the Second Samoan Civil War, resulting in the formal partition of the Samoan archipelago into a German colony and the U.S. territory of what is now called American Samoa. The United States annexed Tutuila in 1900, Manu'a in 1904, and Swains Island in 1925.

The eastern Samoan islands became a territory of the United States. The western islands, by far the greater landmass, became known as German Samoa, after Britain gave up all claims to Samoa and in return accepted the termination of German rights in Tonga and certain areas in the Solomon Islands and West Africa. Forerunners to the Tripartite Convention of 1899 were the Washington Conference of 1887, the Treaty of Berlin of 1889, and the Anglo-German Agreement on Samoa of 1899.

The following year, the U.S. formally annexed its portion, a smaller group of eastern islands, one of which contains the noted harbor of Pago Pago. After the United States Navy took possession of eastern Samoa for the United States government, the existing coaling station at Pago Pago Bay was expanded into a full naval station, known as United States Naval Station Tutuila and commanded by a commandant. The Navy secured a Deed of Cession of Tutuila in 1900 and a Deed of Cession of Manuʻa in 1904 on behalf of the U.S. government. The last sovereign of Manuʻa, the Tui Manuʻa Elisala, signed a Deed of Cession of Manuʻa following a series of U.S. naval trials, known as the "Trial of the Ipu", in Pago Pago, Taʻu, and aboard a Pacific Squadron gunboat. The territory became known as the U.S. Naval Station Tutuila.

On July 17, 1911, the U.S. Naval Station Tutuila, which was composed of Tutuila, Aunuʻu and Manuʻa, was officially renamed American Samoa. People of Manuʻa had been unhappy since they were left out of the name "Naval Station Tutuila". In May 1911, Governor William Michael Crose authored a letter to the Secretary of the Navy conveying the sentiments of Manuʻa. The department responded that the people should choose a name for their new territory. The traditional leaders chose "American Samoa", and, on July 7, 1911, the solicitor general of the Navy authorized the governor to proclaim it as the name for the new territory.

=== Insular Cases ===
The acquisition of Hawaii, the Philippines, Puerto Rico, Guam, and American Samoa marked a new chapter in U.S. history. Traditionally, territories were acquired by the United States for the purpose of becoming new states on equal footing with already existing states. These islands were acquired as colonies rather than prospective states. The process was validated by the Insular Cases. The Supreme Court ruled that full constitutional rights did not automatically extend to all areas under American control. The Philippines became independent in 1946 and Hawaii became a state in 1959, but Puerto Rico, Guam, and American Samoa remain territories.

According to Frederick Merk, these colonial acquisitions marked a break from the original intention of manifest destiny. Previously, "Manifest Destiny had contained a principle so fundamental that a Calhoun and an O'Sullivan could agree on it—that a people not capable of rising to statehood should never be annexed. That was the principle thrown overboard by the imperialism of 1899." Albert J. Beveridge maintained the contrary at his September 25, 1900, speech in the Auditorium, at Chicago. He declared that the current desire for Cuba and the other acquired territories was identical to the views expressed by Washington, Jefferson and Marshall. Moreover, "the sovereignty of the Stars and Stripes can be nothing but a blessing to any people and to any land." The nascent revolutionary government, desirous of independence, resisted the United States in the Philippine–American War in 1899; it won no support from any government anywhere and collapsed when its leader was captured. William Jennings Bryan denounced the war and any form of future overseas expansion, writing, "'Destiny' is not as manifest as it was a few weeks ago."

=== 20th-century reforms ===
In 1917, all Puerto Ricans were made full American citizens via the Jones Act, which also provided for a popularly elected legislature and a bill of rights, and authorized the election of a Resident Commissioner who has a voice (but no vote) in Congress. In 1934, the Tydings–McDuffie Act put the Philippines on a path to independence, which was realized in 1946 with the Treaty of Manila. The Guam Organic Act of 1950 established Guam alongside Puerto Rico as an unincorporated unorganized territory of the United States, provided for the structure of the island's civilian government, and granted the people U.S. citizenship.

=== 21st century ===
In 2025, Donald Trump became the first president to use the phrase "manifest destiny" during an inaugural address, declaring an extension of American influence "into the stars" with ambitions to plant the U.S. flag on Mars. Since being elected, at various points, Trump has suggested annexing Canada, Greenland, and the Panama Canal, to invade Venezuela and Mexico, and to take over the Gaza Strip. The US Department of Homeland Security used the image of American Progress with the heading "A Heritage to be proud of, a Homeland worth Defending" in a post on social media in August 2025.

== Impact on Native Americans ==
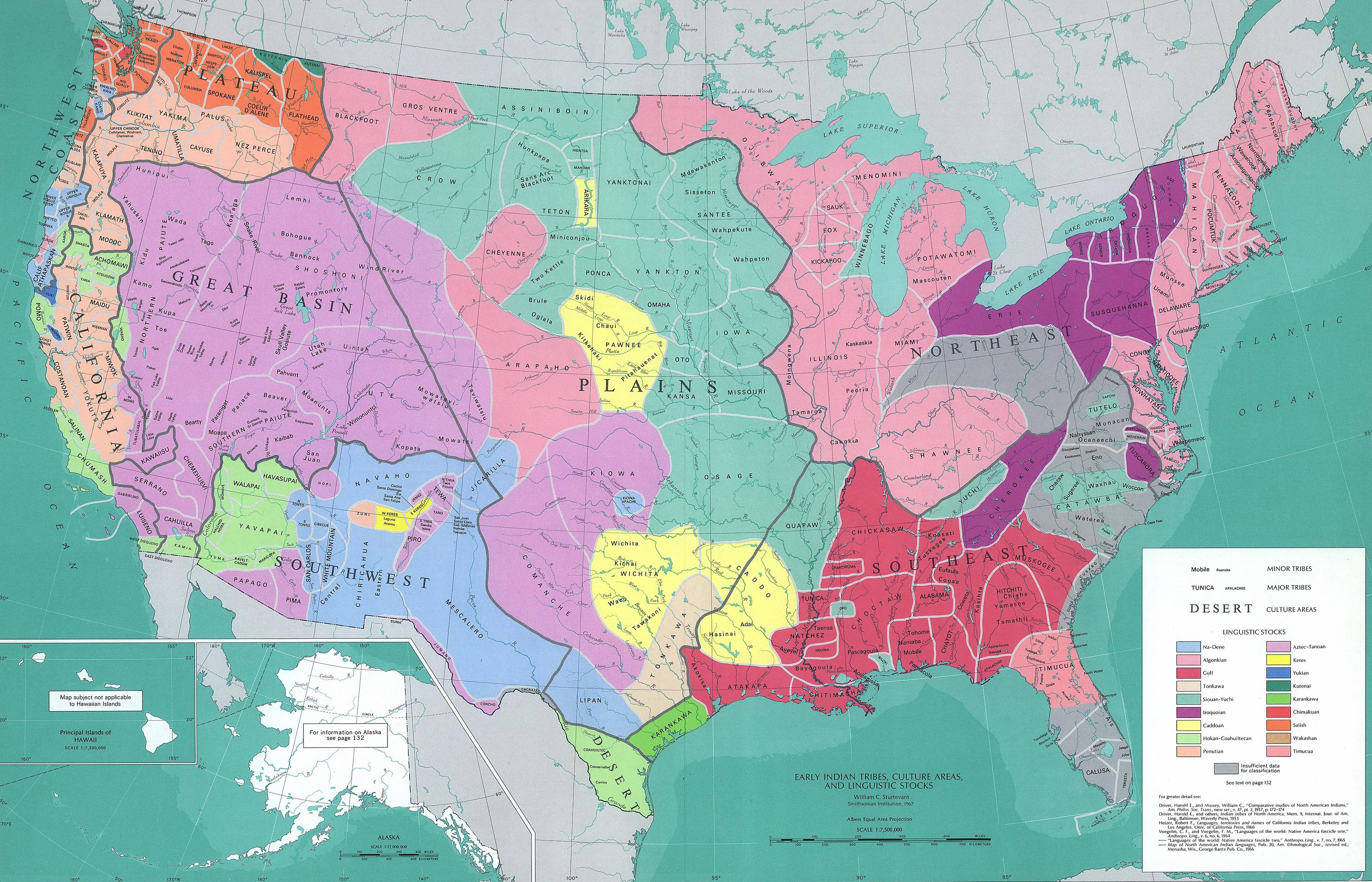
Early Native American tribal territories color-coded by linguistic group

Manifest destiny had serious consequences for Native Americans, since continental expansion implicitly meant the occupation and annexation of Native American land. This ultimately led to confrontations and wars with several groups of native peoples via Indian removal. The United States continued the European practice of recognizing only limited land rights of Indigenous peoples. In a policy formulated largely by Henry Knox, Secretary of War in the Washington Administration, the U.S. government sought to expand into the west through the purchase of Native American land in treaties. Only the federal government could purchase Indian lands, and this was done through treaties with tribal leaders. Whether a tribe actually had a decision-making structure capable of making a treaty was a controversial issue. The national policy was for the Indians to join American society and become "civilized", which meant no more wars with neighboring tribes or raids on white settlers or travelers, and a shift from hunting to farming and ranching. Advocates of civilization programs believed that the process of settling native tribes would greatly reduce the amount of land needed by the Native Americans, making more land available for homesteading by white Americans. Thomas Jefferson believed that, while the Indigenous people of America were intellectual equals to whites, they had to assimilate to and live like the whites or inevitably be pushed aside by them.

According to historian Jeffrey Ostler, Jefferson advocated for the extermination of Indigenous people once he believed assimilation was no longer possible.

On February 27, 1803, Jefferson wrote in a letter to William Henry Harrison:

"but this letter being unofficial, & private, I may with safety give you a more extensive view of our policy respecting the Indians... Our system is to live in perpetual peace with the Indians, to cultivate an affectionate attachment from them, by everything just & liberal which we can do for them within the bounds of reason, and by giving them effectual protection against wrongs from our own people. The decrease of game rendering their subsistence by hunting insufficient, we wish to draw them to agriculture, to spinning & weaving... when they withdraw themselves to the culture of a small piece of land, they will perceive how useless to them are their extensive forests, and will be willing to pare them off from time to time in exchange for necessaries for their farms & families. At our trading houses too we mean to sell so low as merely to repay us cost and charges so as neither to lessen or enlarge our capital. this is what private traders cannot do, for they must gain; they will consequently retire from the competition, & we shall thus get clear of this pest without giving offence or umbrage to the Indians. in this way our settlements will gradually circumbscribe & approach the Indians, & they will in time either incorporate with us as citizens of the U.S. or remove beyond the Mississippi."

Noted by Law Scholar and professor Robert J. Miller, Thomas Jefferson "Understood and utilized the Doctrine of Discovery [aka Manifest destiny] through his political careers and was heavily involved in using the Doctrine against Indian tribes." Jefferson was "often immersed in Indian affairs through his legal and political careers" and "was also well acquainted with the process Virginia governments had historically used to extinguish Indian [land] titles". Jefferson used this knowledge to make the Louisiana purchase in 1803, aided in the construction of the Indian Removal Policy, and laid the ground work for removing Native American tribes further and further into eventual small reservation territories. The idea of "Indian removal" gained traction in the context of manifest destiny and, with Jefferson as one of the main political voices on the subject, accumulated advocates who believed that American Indians would be better off moving away from white settlers. The removal effort was further solidified through policy by Andrew Jackson when he signed the Indian Removal Act in 1830. In his First Annual Message to Congress in 1829, Jackson stated with regard to removal:

I suggest for your consideration the propriety of setting apart an ample district west of the Mississippi, and without the limits of any state or territory now formed, to be guaranteed to the Indian tribes as long as they shall occupy it, each tribe having a distinct control over the portion designated for its use. There they may be secured in the enjoyment of governments of their own choice, subject to no other control from the United States than such as may be necessary to preserve peace on the frontier and between the several tribes. There the benevolent may endeavor to teach them the arts of civilization, and, by promoting union and harmony among them, to raise up an interesting commonwealth, destined to perpetuate the race and to attest the humanity and justice of this government."

Following the forced removal of many Indigenous Peoples, Americans increasingly believed that Native American ways of life would eventually disappear as the United States expanded. Humanitarian advocates of removal believed that American Indians would be better off moving away from whites. As historian Reginald Horsman argued in his influential study Race and Manifest Destiny, racial rhetoric increased during the era of manifest destiny. Americans increasingly believed that Native American ways of life would "fade away" as the United States expanded. As an example, this idea was reflected in the work of one of America's first great historians, Francis Parkman, whose landmark book The Conspiracy of Pontiac was published in 1851. Parkman wrote that after the French defeat in the French and Indian War, Indians were "destined to melt and vanish before the advancing waves of Anglo-American power, which now rolled westward unchecked and unopposed". Parkman emphasized that the collapse of Indian power in the late 18th century had been swift and was a past event.

== Legacy and consequences ==
The belief in an American mission to promote and defend democracy throughout the world, as expounded by Jefferson and his "Empire of Liberty", and continued by Lincoln, Wilson and George W. Bush, continues to have an influence on American political ideology. Under Douglas MacArthur, the Americans "were imbued with a sense of manifest destiny," says historian John Dower.

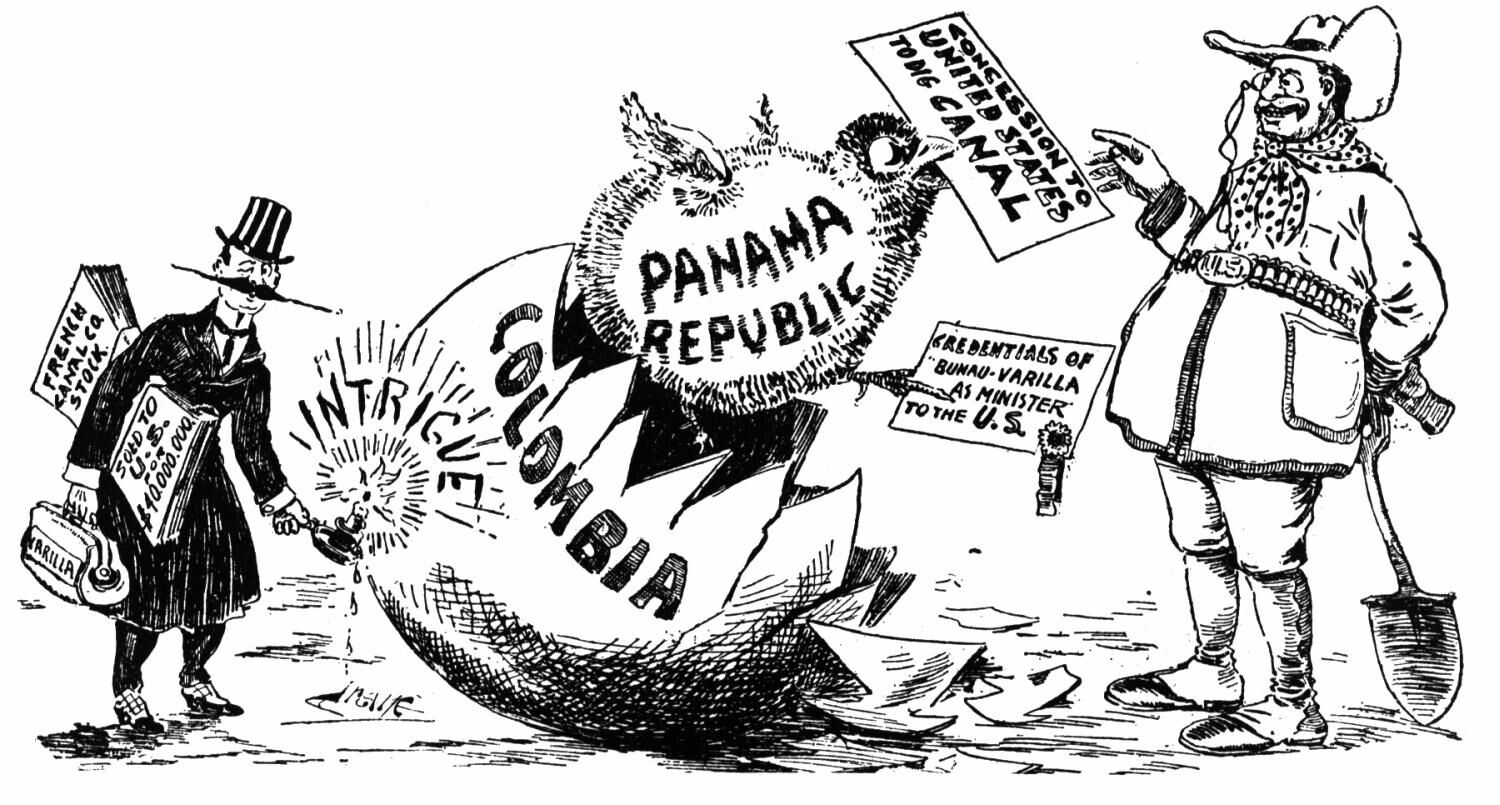
The U.S.'s intentions to influence the area (especially the Panama Canal construction and control) led to the separation of Panama from Colombia in 1903.

After the turn of the 19th century to the 20th century, the phrase manifest destiny declined in usage, as territorial expansion ceased to be promoted as being a part of America's "destiny". Under President Theodore Roosevelt, the role of the United States in the New World was defined, in the 1904 Roosevelt Corollary to the Monroe Doctrine, as being an "international police power" to secure American interests in the Western Hemisphere. Roosevelt's corollary contained an explicit rejection of territorial expansion. In the past, manifest destiny had been seen as necessary to enforce the Monroe Doctrine in the Western Hemisphere, but now expansionism had been replaced by interventionism as a core value associated with the doctrine.

President Wilson continued the policy of interventionism in the Americas, and attempted to redefine both manifest destiny and America's "mission" on a broader, worldwide scale. Wilson led the United States into World War I with the argument that "The world must be made safe for democracy." In his 1920 message to Congress after the war, Wilson stated:

... I think we all realize that the day has come when Democracy is being put upon its final test. The Old World is just now suffering from a wanton rejection of the principle of democracy and a substitution of the principle of autocracy as asserted in the name, but without the authority and sanction, of the multitude. This is the time of all others when Democracy should prove its purity and its spiritual power to prevail. It is surely the manifest destiny of the United States to lead in the attempt to make this spirit prevail.

This was the only time a president had used the phrase "manifest destiny" in his annual address. Wilson's version of manifest destiny was a rejection of expansionism and an endorsement (in principle) of self-determination, emphasizing that the United States had a mission to be a world leader for the cause of democracy. This U.S. vision of itself as the leader of the "Free World" would grow stronger in the 20th century after the end of World War II, although rarely would it be described as "manifest destiny", as Wilson had done.

"Manifest destiny" is sometimes used by critics of U.S. foreign policy to characterize interventions in the Middle East and elsewhere. In this usage, "manifest destiny" is interpreted as the underlying cause of what is denounced by some as "American imperialism". A more positive-sounding phrase devised by scholars at the end of the 20th century is "nation building", and State Department official Karin Von Hippel notes that the U.S. has "been involved in nation-building and promoting democracy since the middle of the 19th century and 'Manifest Destiny'".

The ideology of manifest destiny went on to directly inspire Nazi Germany's concept of Lebensraum ("living space"). Adolf Hitler and Nazi ideologues explicitly studied American westward expansion, including the legal techniques of land seizure, population displacement, and the rationalization of racial supremacy, as a model for their own campaigns of conquest and ethnic cleansing in Eastern Europe.

The ideology of manifest destiny was also consciously adopted by the Empire of Japan to justify its own imperial expansion and Japanese racial supremacy. Already in 1936, a New Zealand newspaper observed that Japan interpreted any Chinese effort to develop its economy independently "as an attempt to hinder the fulfilment of her own 'manifest destiny' on the Asiatic mainland." By April 1941, as diplomatic tensions with the United States escalated, The New York Times reported that Japanese leaders were determined to pursue a course "which they regard as Japan's 'manifest destiny', that is, the creation of a 'Greater East Asia co‑prosperity sphere' under Japan's leadership." Historian Iris Chang explicitly drew the parallel in her account of the 1937 Rape of Nanking, stating: "If expansion westward to the Pacific Ocean was the manifest destiny of the nineteenth-century United States, then China was twentieth-century Japan's manifest destiny."

== Criticisms ==
Critics have condemned manifest destiny as an ideology used to justify dispossession and genocide against indigenous peoples. Critics argue it resulted in the forceful settler-colonial displacement of Indigenous Americans in order to carry out colonial expansion.

Critics at the time of the country's growing desire for expansion doubted the country's ability to rule such an extensive empire.

== See also ==
- American frontier
  - Frontier Thesis
- Christian mission
- Civilizing mission
- "The White Man's Burden" (1899)
- Young America movement
- List of United States invasions of Latin American countries
