= Constitution of American Samoa =

The Constitution of American Samoa is the constitution that defines the government of American Samoa. Unlike constitutions of a state, it is subject to unilateral change by the federal government. Constitutional documents of the territory include the treaties that created it and the 1960 constitution (as amended) approved by the federal government and popular referendum.

== History ==
In 1956, Governor Richard Barrett Lowe initiated the development of an American Samoa Constitution by appointing a Constitutional Committee.

The original Constitution was adopted by a constitutional convention and was signed by the 68 members of the convention and United States Secretary of the Interior Fred Andrew Seaton on 27 April 1960 and became effective 17 October 1960. A Constitutional Convention of American Samoa in Fagatogo begun on 26 September 1966 and approved several amendments, which were approved in a referendum in the general elections in 1966, promulgated by Interior Secretary Stewart Udall on 2 June 1967, and became effective 1 July 1967.

The Constitution was created during the first term of former Governor Peter Tali Coleman. Governor Coleman chaired the convention which drafted the original constitution. It included a bill of rights and provided protection for American Sāmoans against alienation of their lands and loss of culture. Savali Talavou Ale led the committee assignment of reviewing the constitution in the American Samoa House of Representatives.

To prevent the Secretary of the Interior from appointing an Attorney General independent of the elected Governor, the United States Congress passed a law in 1983 mandating that amendments to the Constitution be made by Congress alone. This law was repealed in 2025.

== Other constitutional documents ==
The Ratification Act of 1929 was joint resolution of the United States Congress that ratified the Treaty of Cession of Tutuila of 1900 and the Treaty of Cession of Manuʻa of 1904, which ceded the islands of Tutuila and Manuʻa, respectively, to the United States and now form part of American Samoa. These agreements came about because of the Second Samoan Civil War and the Tripartite Convention of 1899 between the United States, the United Kingdom, and the German Empire.

== See also ==
- Constitution of American Samoa (1960)
- American Samoan constitutional referendum, 2010
