= Government of American Samoa =

American Samoa governmental body

The government of American Samoa is defined under the Constitution of American Samoa.

The United States Congress, in the Ratification Act of 1929, provided that until the Congress shall provide for the Government of the islands of American Samoa all civil, judicial, and military powers shall be vested in such person or persons and exercised in such manner as the President of the United States shall direct. In Executive Order 10264, the President of the United States directed that the Secretary of the Interior should take care for the administration of civil government in American Samoa. The Secretary promulgated the Constitution of American Samoa which was approved by a Constitutional Convention of the people of American Samoa and a majority of the voters of American Samoa voting at the 1966 election, and came into effect in 1967. The Secretary retains ultimate authority.

The government operates under a framework of a presidential representative democratic dependency, whereby the Governor of American Samoa is the head of government. Legislative power is vested in the American Samoa Fono. The judiciary is independent of the executive and the legislature.

== Executive ==
The power of the executive is formally vested in the governor, elected by popular vote for a four-year term along with the lieutenant governor in the same ticket. The governor's office is located in Utulei.

The governor appoints chiefs of executive agencies, districts, counties and villages.

== Legislature ==
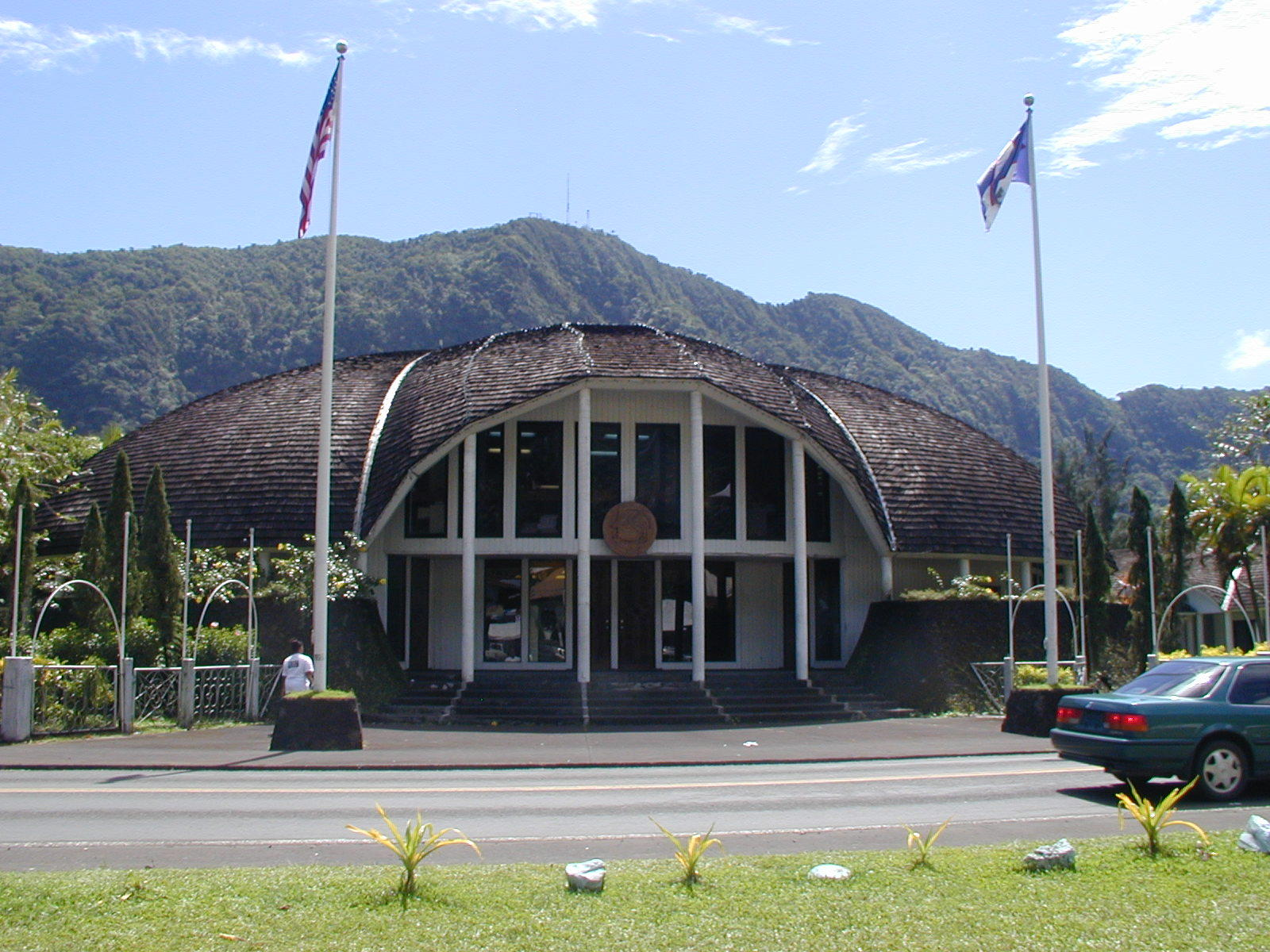
The American Samoa Legislature Maota Fono building in Fagatogo

The Legislature, or Fono, has two chambers. The House of Representatives has 21 members serving two-year terms, being 20 representatives popularly elected from various districts and one non-voting delegate from Swains Island elected in a public meeting. The Senate has 18 members, elected for four-year terms by and from the chiefs of the islands. The Fono is located in Fagatogo.

== Judiciary ==
The Judiciary of American Samoa is defined under the Constitution of American Samoa and the American Samoa Code. It consists of the High Court of American Samoa, a District Court, and village courts, all under the administration and supervision of the Chief Justice. The High Court and District Court are both located in Fagatogo. The Chief Justice and the Associate Justice of the High Court are appointed by the United States Secretary of the Interior. Associate judges of the High Court, who may also serve in the village courts, and judges of the District Court are appointed by the governor upon the recommendation of the Chief Justice and confirmed by the Senate.

Because American Samoa does not have a federal court like the Northern Mariana Islands, Guam, or the United States Virgin Islands, matters of federal law arising in American Samoa have generally been adjudicated in the United States District Court for the District of Hawaii or the District Court for the District of Columbia.
