= 1986 American Samoan constitutional referendum =

American Samoan ballot measure

A referendum on a new constitution was held in American Samoa on 4 November 1986. Voters were asked to approve a proposed constitution developed by a Constitutional Council. The measure failed and the 1960 constitution remained in force. A key reason for this were the proposed changes to how the American Samoa Senate was selected.
