= Ratification Act of 1929 =

The Ratification Act of 1929 (Pub. Res. 70–89, 45 Stat. 1253, enacted February 20, 1929, codified at 48 U.S.C. § 1661) was a joint resolution of the United States Congress that authorized the ratification of the 1900 Treaty of Cession of Tutuila and the 1904 Treaty of Cession of Manu'a, which respectively ceded to the United States the islands of Tutuila and Manu'a that now form part of American Samoa. As such, it is one of the basic Constitutional documents of American Samoa. These agreements came about because of the Second Samoan Civil War and the Tripartite Convention of 1899 between the United States, the United Kingdom, and the German Empire.

It provided that, until the Congress provided for the Government of the islands of American Samoa, all civil, judicial, and military powers would be exercised at the direction of the President of the United States. In Executive Order 10264 of July 3, 1951, the President of the United States directed that the Secretary of the Interior should take care for the administration of civil government in American Samoa. The Secretary promulgated the Constitution of American Samoa, which was approved by a Constitutional Convention of the people of American Samoa and a majority of the voters of American Samoa voting at the 1966 election, and which came into effect in 1967.

== See also ==
- History of American Samoa
