= Treaty of Berlin (1889) =

1889 treaty between the United Kingdom, United States, and Germany

General act providing for the neutrality and autonomous government of the Samoan Islands
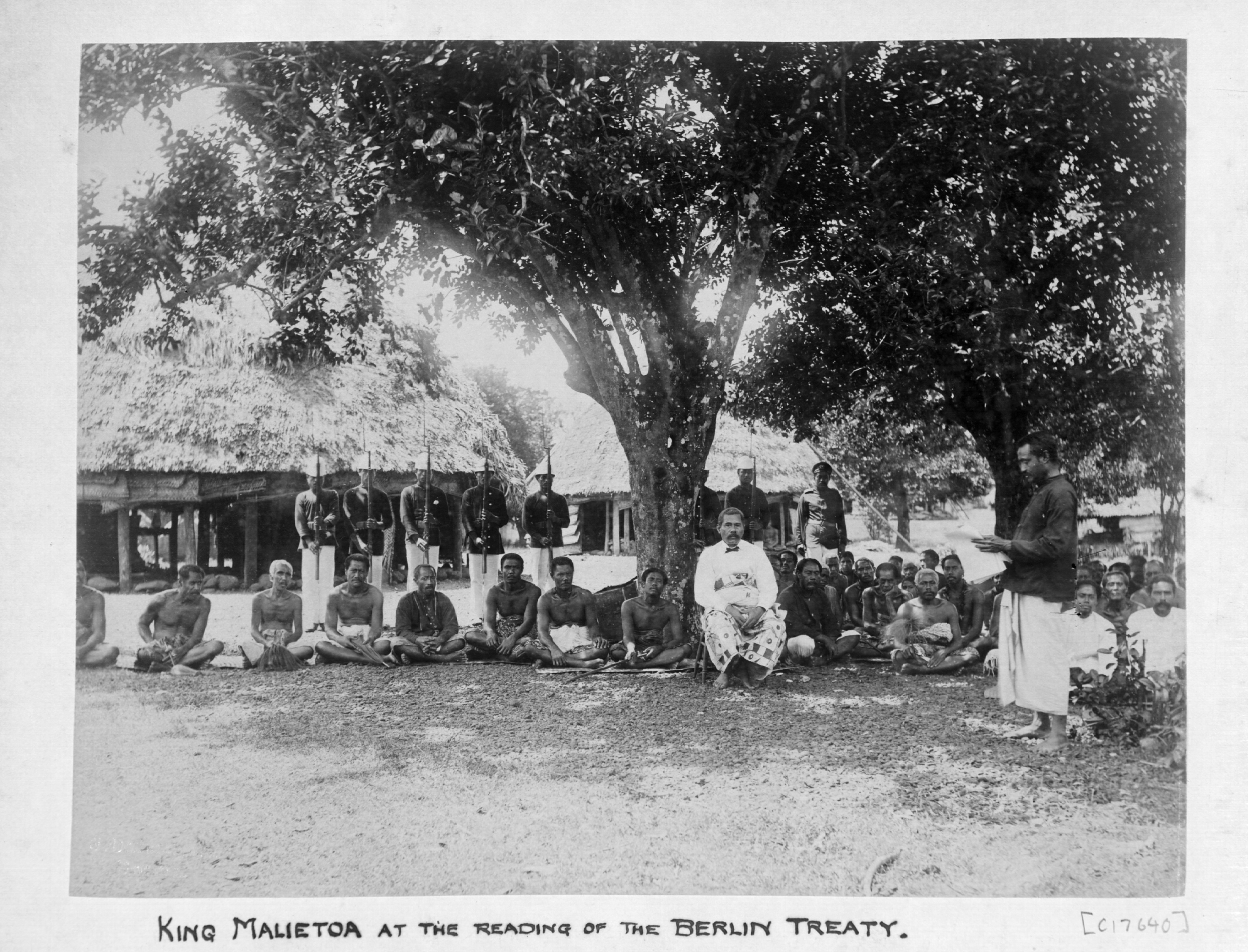
- King Malietoa at the reading of the Berlin Treaty, 1889
- Signed: 14 June 1889
- Location: Berlin, Germany
- Signatories: German Empire; United Kingdom; United States
- Citations: 172 Parry 133, 134 (E); 81 BFSP 1058; 15 Martens 2d 571 (E, G); 26 Stat. 1497; TS 313; 2 Malloy 1576; 1 Bevans 116; S.Ex. B, 51-1; 18 Hertslet 1068

Full text
- General Act of Berlin (1889) at Wikisource
- Abrogated by the Tripartite Convention of 2 December 1899 (31 Stat. 1878; TS 314; 1 Bevans 276).

The Treaty of Berlin (1889) (also known as the Samoan Treaty) was the concluding document of the conference at Berlin in 1889 on Samoa. The conference was proposed by German foreign minister Count Herbert von Bismarck (son of chancellor Otto von Bismarck) to reconvene the adjourned Washington conference on Samoa of 1887. Herbert von Bismarck invited delegations from the United States and the British Empire to Berlin in April 1889.

== Condominium in Samoa between the United States, Germany and Great Britain ==
The treaty launched the condominium in Samoa between the United States, Germany and Great Britain. It was designed to guarantee the preservation of rights of the three powers as secured in separate treaties with the Samoan régime in 1878 and 1879. Further, the independence and neutrality of the Samoan government was ensured, public finance was reorganized and the Samoan king elected in 1881 was restored.

== the King of Sweden chosen to arbitrate disagreements ==
The treaty established a court and the position of a "Chief Justice of Samoa" who would be appointed by all three powers. If they could not reach an agreement on the appointment, the position would be appointed by the King of Sweden. In an effort to strengthen the judiciary an American/European chief justice position was created, and the municipality of Apia was reestablished, chaired by a council president.

== Signing of the treaty and ratifications ==
The treaty was signed at Berlin by the three powers on 14 June 1889. It was ratified by the United States Senate on February 3, 1890. Ratifications were exchanged on 12 April 1890 and assented to by the Samoan government on 19 April 1890, in effect four governments were party to the Berlin Act.

== 1899 end of the condominium and partition of the Samoan archipelago ==
The condominium ended in political shambles after ten years with the ratification of the Tripartite Convention of 1899 and the resulting partition of the Samoan archipelago.

== See also ==
- List of treaties
