= Treaty of Cession of Manu'a =

1904 treaty between the United States and Samoa

The Treaty of Cession of Manuʻa, also known as the Deed of Cession of Manuʻa, was a treaty between Tui Manuʻa Elisala and the United States signed on July 16, 1904, that ceded the islands of Manuʻa to the United States, which now forms part of American Samoa. It came about because of the Second Samoan Civil War and the Tripartite Convention of 1899 between the United States, the United Kingdom, and the German Empire. It was ratified by the United States Congress by the Ratification Act of 1929.

== Background ==
Following the Tripartite Convention of 1899, the Samoan islands east of longitude 171° west of Greenwich were placed under the protection of the United States. On April 17, 1900, the chiefs of Tutuila and Aunuʻu signed the Treaty of Cession of Tutuila, formally ceding those islands to the United States. The Manuʻa Islands, ruled by Tui Manuʻa Elisala, remained outside this arrangement, though the United States flag was raised on the island of Taʻū in June 1900, at the request of Tui Manuʻa and his chiefs for protection. (Note: Sources conflict on the exact date: the American Samoa Bar Association gives June 15, while the U.S. Department of State FRUS record gives June 5.) On July 14, 1904, Tui Manuʻa Elisala and his principal chiefs formally executed the instrument of cession at Faleula in Taʻū, which was certified on July 16, 1904. The treaty was ratified by the United States Congress through the Ratification Act of 1929, officially incorporating Manuʻa into what is now American Samoa.

== Signatories ==
The instrument was signed on July 14, 1904, at the place of Faleula in Taʻū, and certified on July 16, 1904, before Edwin William Gurr, District Judge of Tutuila, who personally attested to the identity of the signatories.

- Tui Manuʻa Elisala, King of Manuʻa and District Governor
- Tufele, County Chief of Fītiuta
- Misa, County Chief of Ofu
- Tuiolosega, County Chief of Olosega
- Asoau, County Chief of Faleasao
- P. Logoai, District Clerk of Manuʻa

== See also ==
- Treaty of Cession of Tutuila
- Tripartite Convention
- History of American Samoa
