= Treaty of Cession of Tutuila =

1900 treaty between the United States and Samoa

Signatories, Deed of Cession of Tutuila, 1900

The Treaty of Cession of Tutuila (also known as the Deed of Cession of Tutuila) was a treaty between the United States and several chiefs of the island of Tutuila signed on April 17, 1900, whereby the chiefs ceded the island of Tutuila and swore allegiance to the United States, which now forms part of American Samoa. In the late 19th century, there was increased competition among the United States, Germany and the United Kingdom for influence and control in the Pacific region, which was seen as a strategic location for naval bases.

== Background ==
The Second Samoan Civil War occurred between 1898 and 1899 because of conflicts among high-ranking Samoan chiefs and the influence of Germany, the United States and the United Kingdom for control over the Samoan islands. The Tripartite Convention of 1899 ended the Second Samoan Civil War and was signed between the United States, the United Kingdom, and the German Empire partitioning the Samoan islands under German and U.S. control. The Samoan Islands had also experienced political instability and conflict among rival chiefs. U.S. representatives in the region engaged with local chiefs to persuade them of the benefits of ceding the territory to the U.S. The chiefs agreed and the treaty was formally signed on April 17, 1900, in the Gagamoe area in Pago Pago. The first American flag was raised later that same day on Sogelau Hill in Fagatogo. It was ratified by the United States Congress by the Ratification Act of 1929 officially incorporating Tutuila into what is now American Samoa. This treaty marked the beginning of American Samoa as a U.S. territory. Initially, the U.S. Navy governed the island for over fifty years before the territory became self-governing. American Samoa remains an unincorporated territory of the United States.

Samoa's earliest inhabitants arrived as early as 1500 BC, and its history includes notable events such as the arrival of missionary John Williams in the 1830s and significant interactions with European and American traders. The involvement of foreign powers often led to conflicts and political changes, culminating in the treaties that shaped modern American Samoa.

== Later events ==
The matai (local chiefs) of Tutuila ceded the island to the United States, followed by Manu’a in 1904 and Swain Island in 1925 (which was not included in the original treaties cession of Tutuila and Manu’a but was privately owned for decades and annexed by the United States and incorporated into American Samoa ratified by the Swains Island Act of 1925). Initially, the U.S. Navy governed the American Samoa territory until 1951, when authority was transferred to the Department of the Interior. American Samoa adopted its own constitution in 1967, which was approved by the Secretary of the Interior, and held its first constitutional elections in 1977. Unlike citizens of other U.S. territories, American Samoans are U.S. nationals but do not vote in federal elections or pay federal taxes.

== Signatories ==
While the treaty was formally concluded on April 17, an earlier draft of the text had been initially drawn up by the chiefs on April 2, 1900. In accordance with Samoan custom regarding the execution of official documents, the assembled chiefs of each district designated a specific leader to physically sign the instrument on behalf of the collective group (Leoso signed for Fofo and Aitulagi, while Pele signed for Sua and Vaifanua). The signing was witnessed by native advocate and barrister Edwin William Gurr and Commander Benjamin Franklin Tilley.

The chiefs and rulers who subscribed to the official document are recorded under their respective historical political divisions:

=== Fofo and Aitulagi (Western District) ===
- Tuitele of Leone
- Faiivae of Leone
- Letuli of Iliʻili
- Fuimaono of Aoloau
- Satele of Vailoa
- Leoso of Leone
- Olo of Leone
- Namoa of Aitulagi
- Malota of Aitulagi
- Tunaitau of Pavaʻiaʻi
- Lualemana of Asu
- Amituagai of Ituau

=== Sua and Vaifanua (Eastern District) ===
(Note: The official 17 April 1900 Instrument of Cession lists the Eastern District leaders collectively by title without explicitly noting their village names. Their ancestral village ties are confirmed by the preceding 2 April 1900 handwritten draft document.)

- Pele of Lauliʻi
- Mauga of Pago Pago
- Leiato of Fagaitua
- Faumuina of Alofau
- Masaniai of Fagaʻalu
- Tupuola of Fagasā
- Soliai of Nuʻuuli
- Mauga (Note: The name Mauga appears twice in the final instrument as entries No. 14 and No. 20.)

== See also ==
- Treaty of Cession of Manu'a
- Tripartite Convention
- History of American Samoa
