= Tripartite Convention =

1899 treaty ending the Second Samoan Civil War

Convention between the United States, the German Empire, and Great Britain Governments in Respect to Samoa
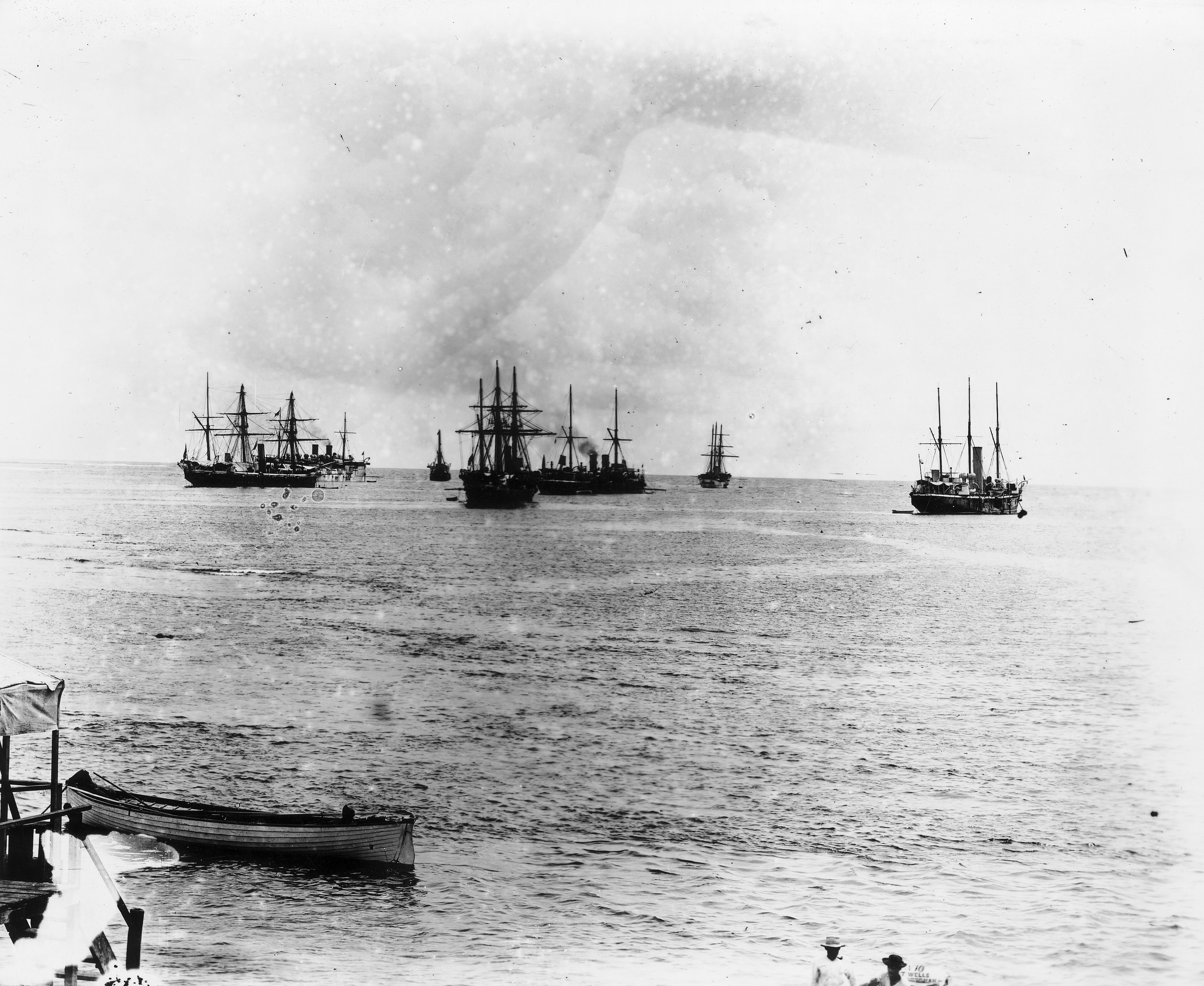
- German, British, and American warships in Apia harbour, 1899
- Signed: 2 December 1899
- Location: Washington, D.C.
- Effective: 16 February 1900
- Signatories: German Empire; United Kingdom; United States
- Citations: 31 Stat. 1878; TS 314; 1 Bevans 276
- Abrogated the Treaty of Friendship and Commerce Between the United States and the Government of the Samoan Islands of 17 February 1878 (20 Stat. 704; TS 312; 1 Bevans 437). Abrogated the Treaty of Berlin of 14 June 1889 (26 Stat. 1497; TS 313; 1 Bevans 116).

The Tripartite Convention of 1899 concluded the Second Samoan Civil War, resulting in the formal partition of the Samoan archipelago into a German colony and a United States territory.

Forerunners to the Tripartite Convention of 1899 were the Washington Conference of 1887, the Treaty of Berlin of 1889, and the Anglo-German Agreement on Samoa of 1899.

== Politics prior to the convention ==
By the 1870s, modern economic conditions were well established and accepted by the Samoans, who had just enough of a government that could be manipulated at will by the foreign business interests in Samoa. After the United States concluded a friendship treaty with Samoa in 1878, Germany negotiated her own Favorite Nation Treaty in 1879 with the same Samoan faction as the U.S., while later in 1879 the Anglo-Samoan treaty was completed with a rival faction. Contentions among the whites in Samoa, plus native factional strife led to side-choosing that became deadly warring with the introduction of modern weapons.

=== Washington conference of 1887 ===
To attempt to resolve some of the problems, the United States, Germany, and the United Kingdom agreed to a conference in Washington in June 1887. After the surfacing of serious disagreements among the parties, the conference adjourned without results. Fighting in and around the Samoan islands by nationals of the three powers, along with their factional local allies, led to a conflict that was only tempered by the Apia hurricane of 1889, a disaster that wrecked warships on the verge of hostilities.

=== Treaty of Berlin of 1889 ===
The seriousness of the situation was finally recognized and German foreign minister Count Herbert von Bismarck (chancellor Otto von Bismarck's son) proposed to reconvene the adjourned Washington conference of 1887. He invited U.S. and British representatives to Berlin in April 1889. Bismarck's pragmatic approach proposed protection for life, property, and commerce of the treaty participants and relegated native government and their unstable "kings" to the Samoans, with which the British concurred. The United States insisted on a three-powers authority while preserving native rights. Thus, in the Treaty of Berlin of 1889, a joint protectorate or condominium was declared, a form of international colonial control: there would be a European/American chief justice, a municipal council for Apia, and a "free right of the natives to elect their Chief or King". This was therefore the first treaty that professed to recognize, at least at some level, a Samoan independent government.

No sooner was this 'native' royal figurehead appointed (and, after disturbances, restored), than the other chiefs rebelled, and civil war ensued. By the end of the 19th century, the failure of the arrangement was freely admitted by the governments of the three powers, since the principal protagonists in Samoa acted directly for their own respective interests, frequently overruling the officials of the condominium.

== Negotiations and ratification of the convention ==
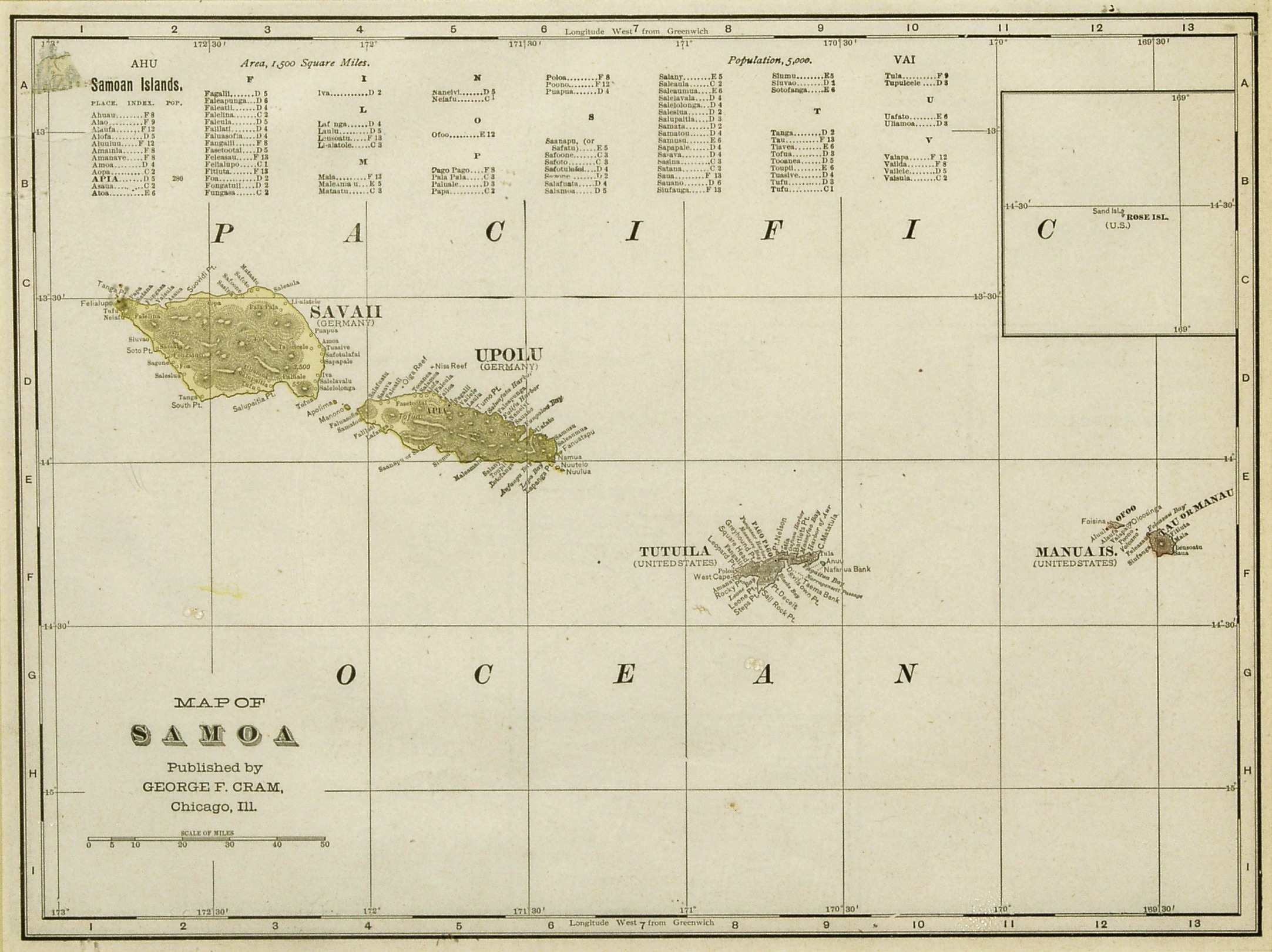
The Samoan Archipelago (1900–1914)

The German government "had never made a secret of their belief that international control of Samoa was visionary and impractical ... and they began a series of diplomatic moves intended to eliminate it altogether." In April 1899, the British government agreed to the formation of a joint commission of Germany, the US and the UK on the matter. The Joint Commission on Samoa was given authority to supersede local authorities and settle matters. Their arrival in May effectively ended hostilities on the islands. By July the Commission had decided that the islands must be partitioned, as continued joint rule was unfeasible. The American commissioner Bartlett Tripp endorsed the view of President McKinley and others that the United States should retain Tutuila and its harbor of Pago Pago. Given partitioning of Samoa by then the prevailing understanding, the United States expressed no objections to Britain and Germany coming to a preliminary agreement. The United Kingdom was by then embroiled in the Second Boer War and therefore viewed as in a weakened bargaining position; however, the German desire to rapidly conclude negotiations and bring the western Samoan islands into their colonial empire had a balancing effect that was clearly evidenced in the agreement as signed.

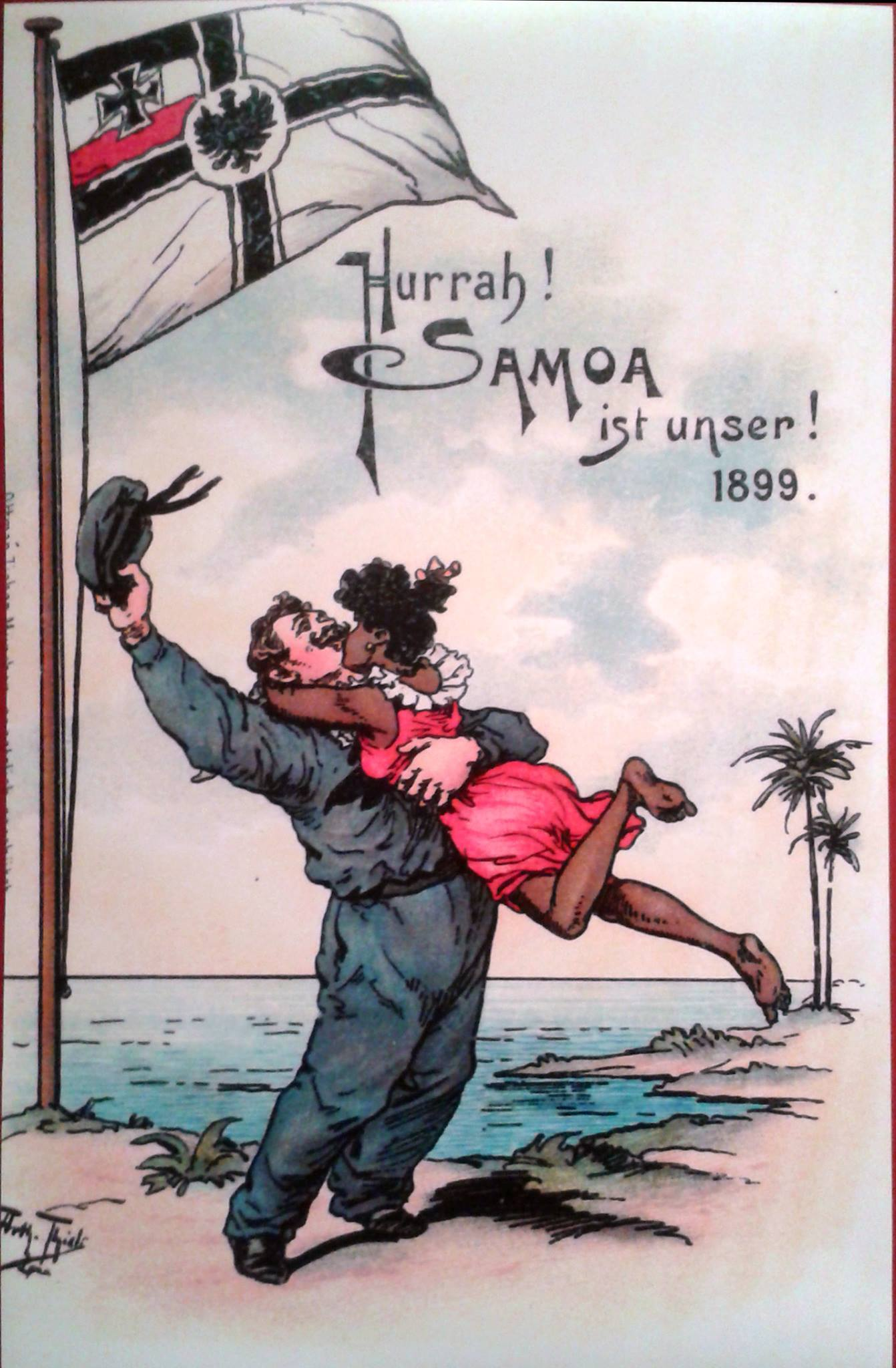
Postcard celebrating the transfer to German control

Kaiser Wilhelm II had accepted an invitation to visit England in November 1899 and his government insisted that an agreement on Samoa should be concluded before his departure for Britain. A settlement was reached at London by 9 November and signed on 14 November 1899. It was therefore this Anglo-German agreement on Samoa, in tandem with the informal understanding with the United States, that effectively determined the practical partitioning of Samoa. As far as the three powers were concerned, it only remained to negotiate a tripartite convention in order to secure the formal approval of the United States of the whole arrangement. The Tripartite Convention of 1899 was duly constituted and documents were signed at Washington on 2 December 1899 by U.S. Secretary of State John Hay, German ambassador to the United States Baron Theodor von Holleben, and British ambassador to the United States Sir Julian Pauncefote. Ratifications were exchanged quickly, on 16 February 1900.

== Positions resulting from the convention ==
=== United States ===
President William McKinley signed an executive order on 19 February 1900, stating: "The Island of Tutuila, of the Samoan Group, and all other islands of the group east of longitude 171 degrees west of Greenwich, are hereby placed under the control of the Department of the Navy for a naval station. The Secretary of the Navy shall take such steps as are necessary to establish the authority of the United States and to give to the islands the necessary protection."

On the same day John D. Long, Secretary of the Navy, stated further that these islands "... are hereby established into a naval station, to be known as the naval station, Tutuila, and to be under the command of a commandant." Rose Island, an uninhabited coral atoll, and the island of Aunuʻu were included. The cession of deeds of the islands of the Manua Group (Taʻū and Ofu-Olosega) did not take place until 1904, although the respective chiefs had previously accepted the sovereignty of the United States. The term "American Samoa" entered into conscious usage in 1905 with a first assembly, or fono, of the Samoan chiefs on all ceded islands within the naval station.

=== German Empire ===
The Samoan islands of Upolu and Savaii and the small islands of Apolima and Manono, west of 171 degrees west longitude, were declared a protectorate of the German Empire, and became known as German Samoa, with a flag raising on 1 March 1900, and appointment of Wilhelm Solf as governor. This "happy acquisition" was viewed in Germany as a "splendid achievement in colonial policy, which is at the same time a genuinely popular one."

=== United Kingdom ===
By surrendering all rights in Samoa, the United Kingdom "obtained extensive compensation from Germany elsewhere", in effect,

- "transfer of all of the German rights in the Tonga group including"
  - "that of establishing a naval and coaling station,"
  - "and the right of extraterritoriality;"
- "the shifting of the line of demarcation between German and British islands in the Solomon group so as to give to Great Britain all the German islands to the east and southeast of the island of Bougainville;"
- "the division of the so-called neutral zone in West Africa by a definite boundary line between British and German possessions;"
- "the promise of Germany to take into consideration, as much and as far as possible, the wishes which the Government of Great Britain may express with regard to the development of reciprocal tariffs in the territories of"
  - "Togo and"
  - "the Gold Coast;"
- "the renouncing by Germany of her rights of extraterritoriality in Zanzibar."

These treaty arrangements of the Tripartite Convention of 1899 stayed in place until the outbreak of World War I in 1914.

== See also ==
- Kingdom of Samoa
- Samoan unification
- Treaty of Cession of Tutuila
- Treaty of Cession of Manu'a

== Bibliography and references ==
- Coates, Austin (1970). Western Pacific islands. The Corona library. London: H.M.S.O. ISBN 978-0-11-880428-8.
- Gilson, Richard Phillip (1970). Samoa 1830 to 1900: the politics of a multi-cultural community. Oxford University Press. ISBN 978-0-19-550301-2.
- Gray, J. A. C. (1980). Amerika Samoa: A History of American Samoa and Its United States Naval Administration. Navies and men. New York: Arno Press. ISBN 978-0-405-13038-0.
- Ryden, George Herbert (1975). The foreign policy of the United States in relation to Samoa. New York: Octagon Books. ISBN 978-0-374-97000-0. (Reprinted by special arrangement with Yale University Press. Originally published at New Haven: Yale University Press. 1928.)
- Townsend, Mary Evelyn (1921). Origins of Modern German Colonialism, 1871–1885 (PDF) (PhD thesis). New York: Columbia University.
