= Tuālāuta County =

County in American Samoa, United States

Coordinates: 14°21′6″S 170°44′49″W

Tuālāuta County, American Samoa
- County
- Tuālāuta County
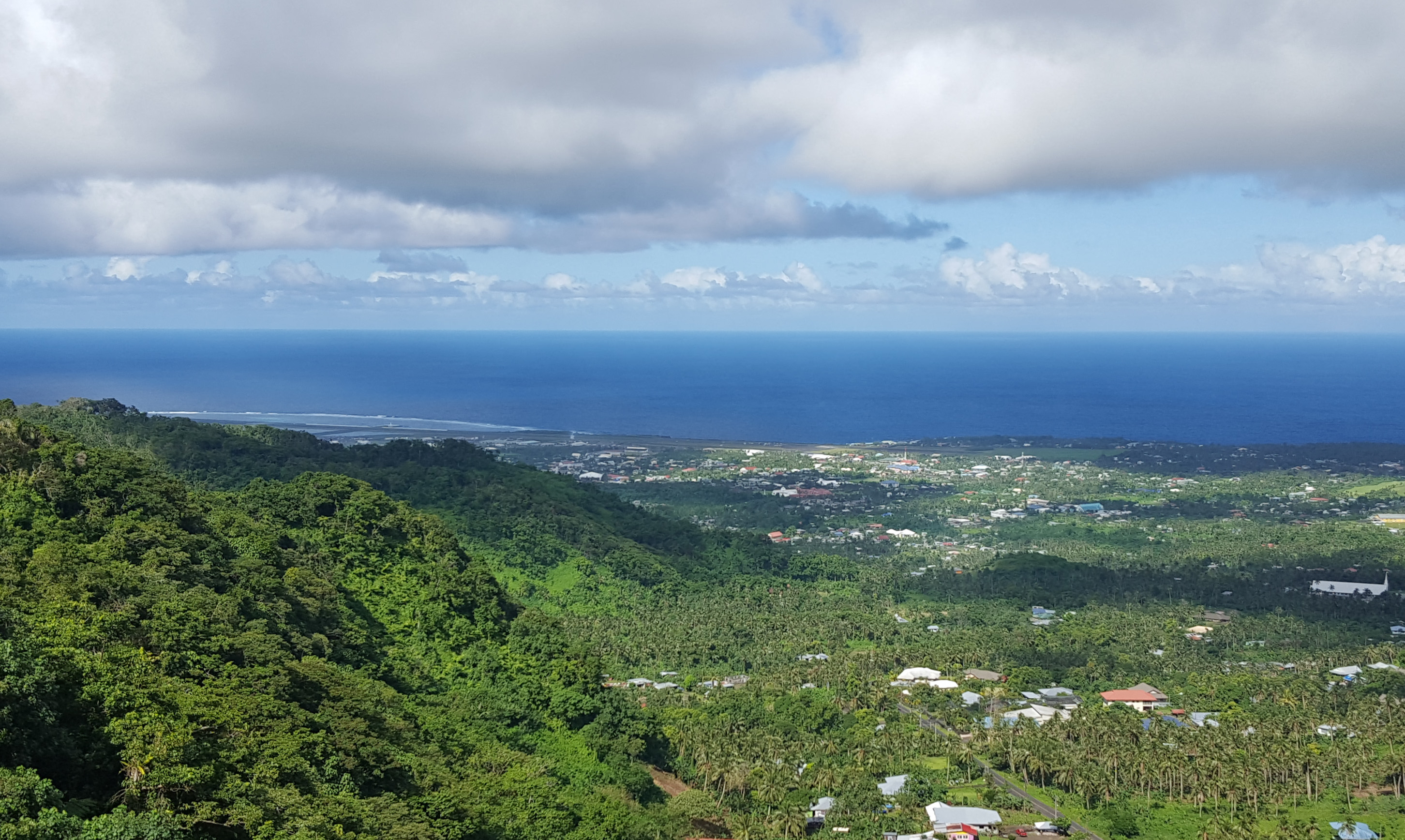
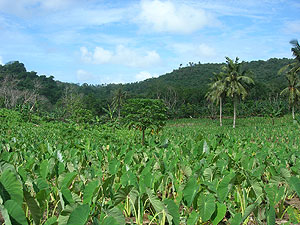
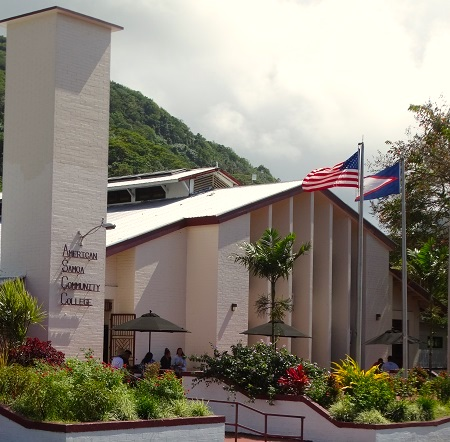
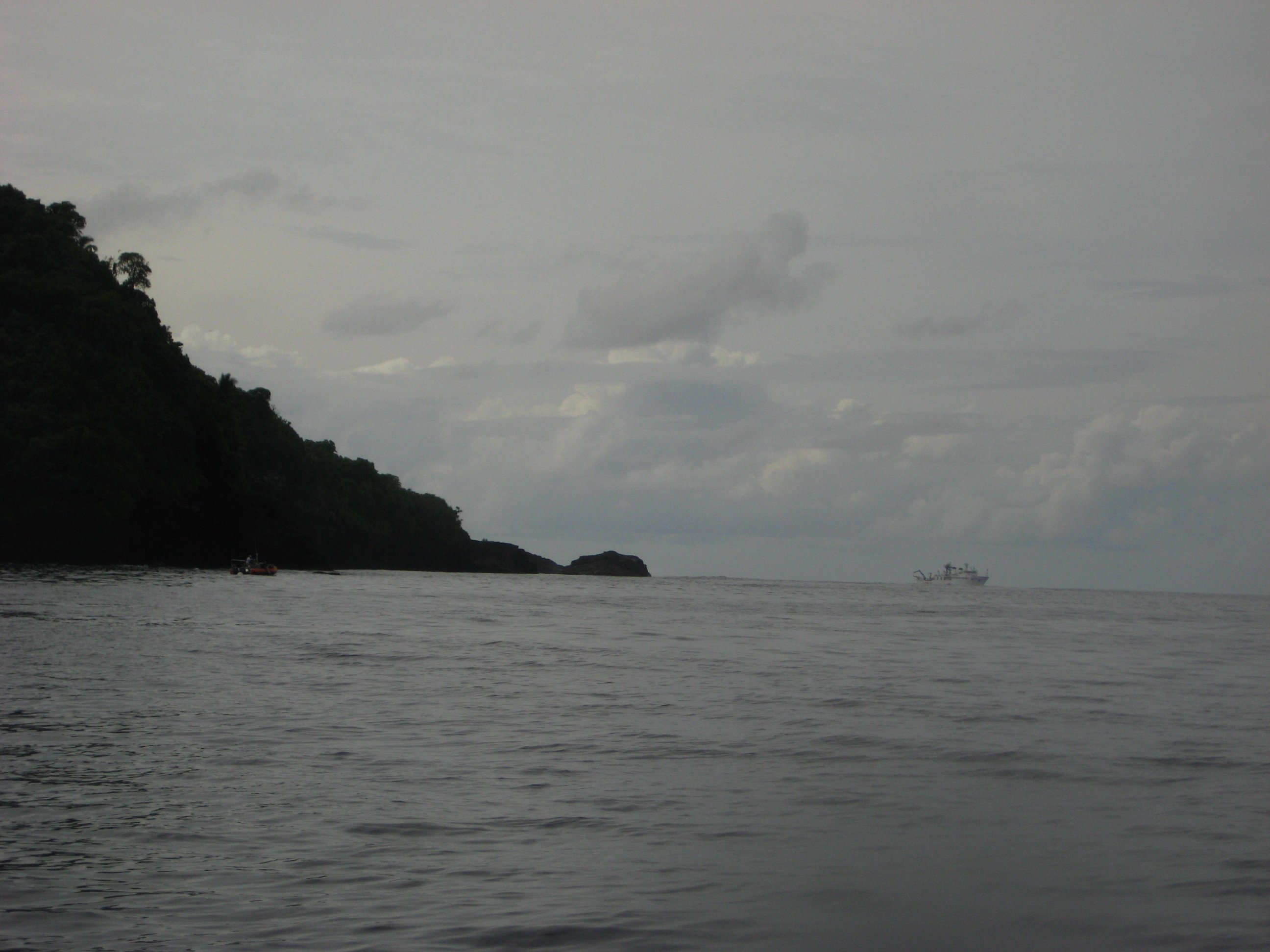
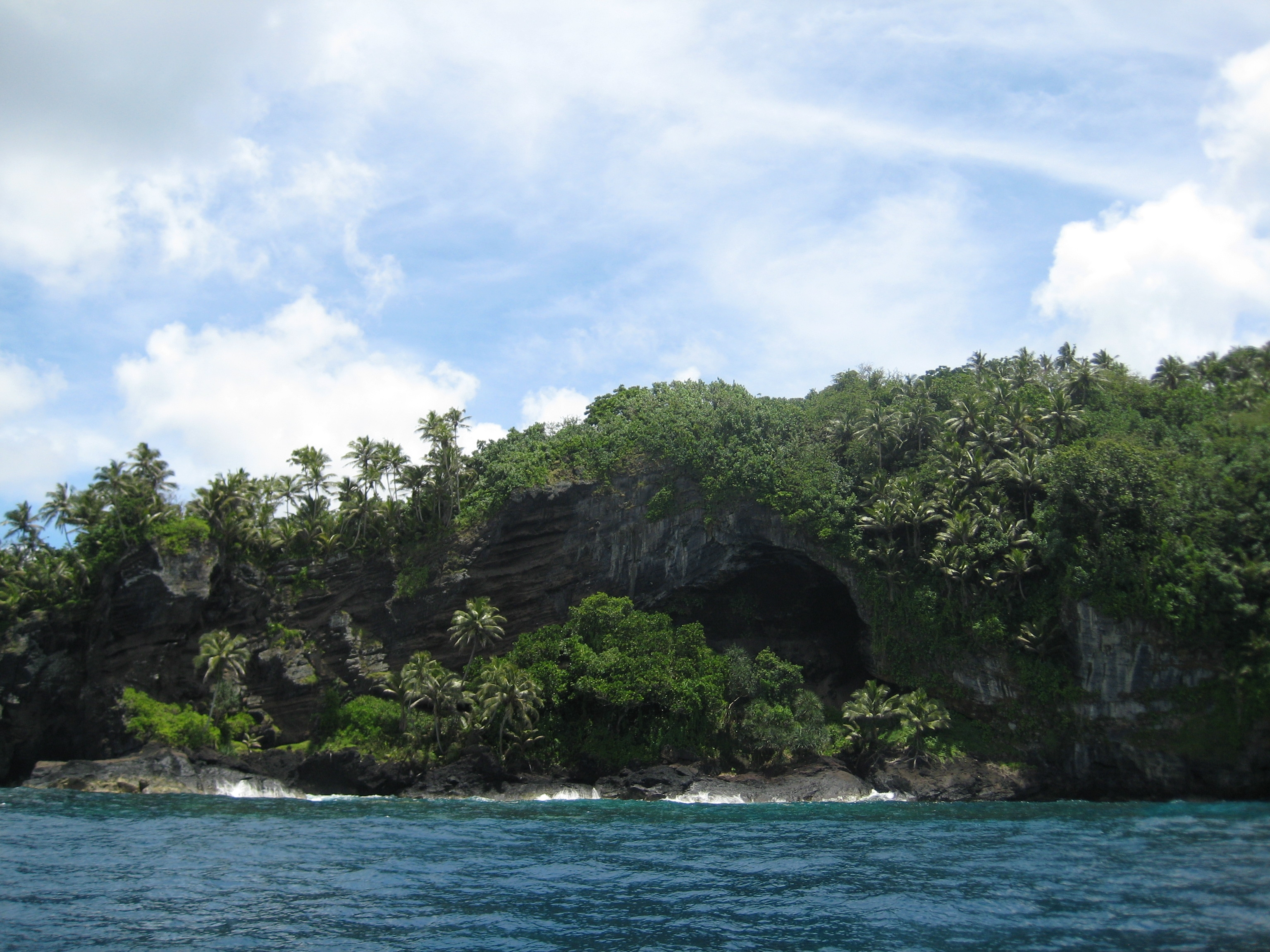
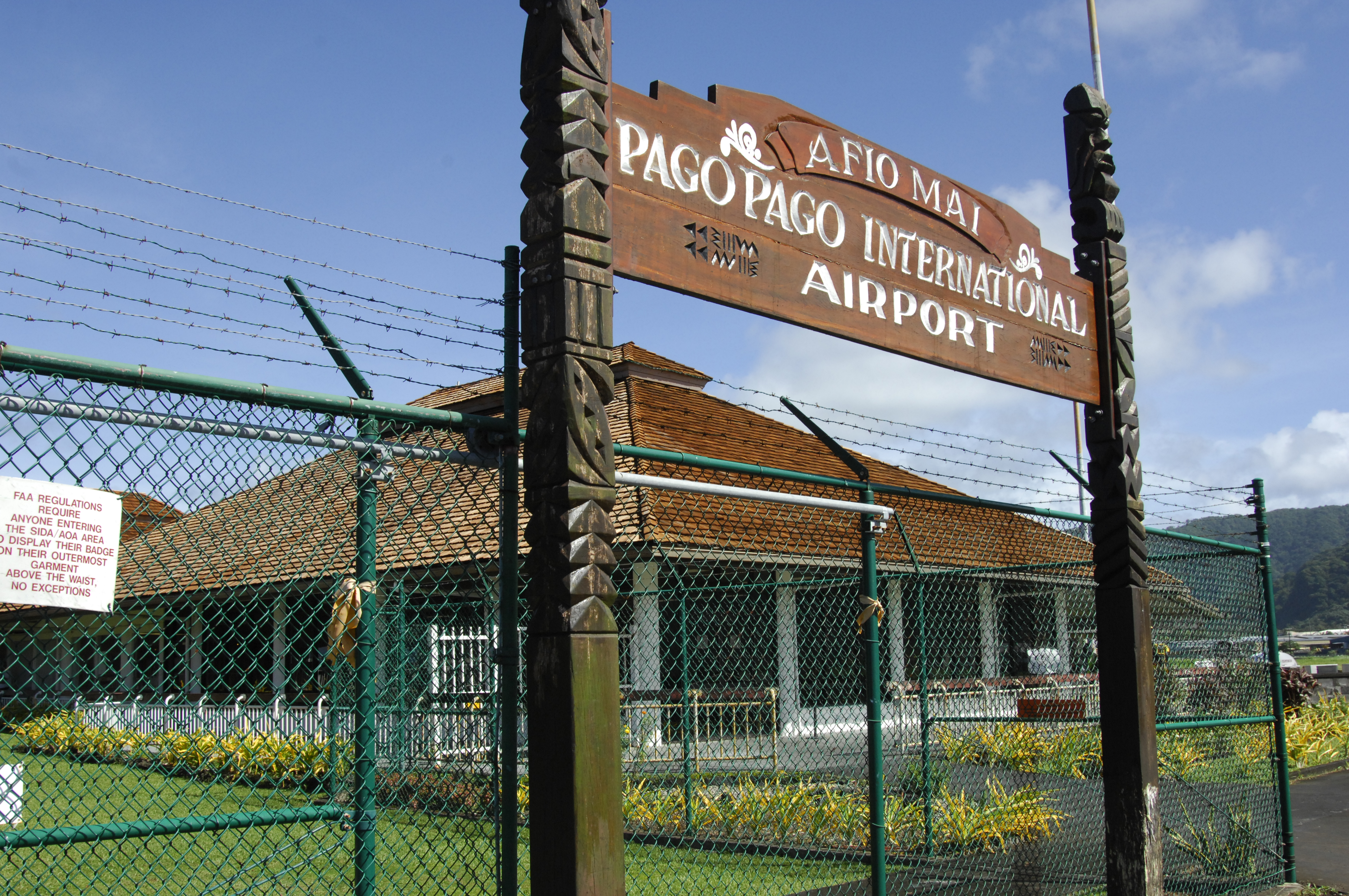
- Tāfuna Fogāma'a Crater National Natural Landmark American Samoa Community College Steps Point Larsen's Bay Pago Pago International Airport

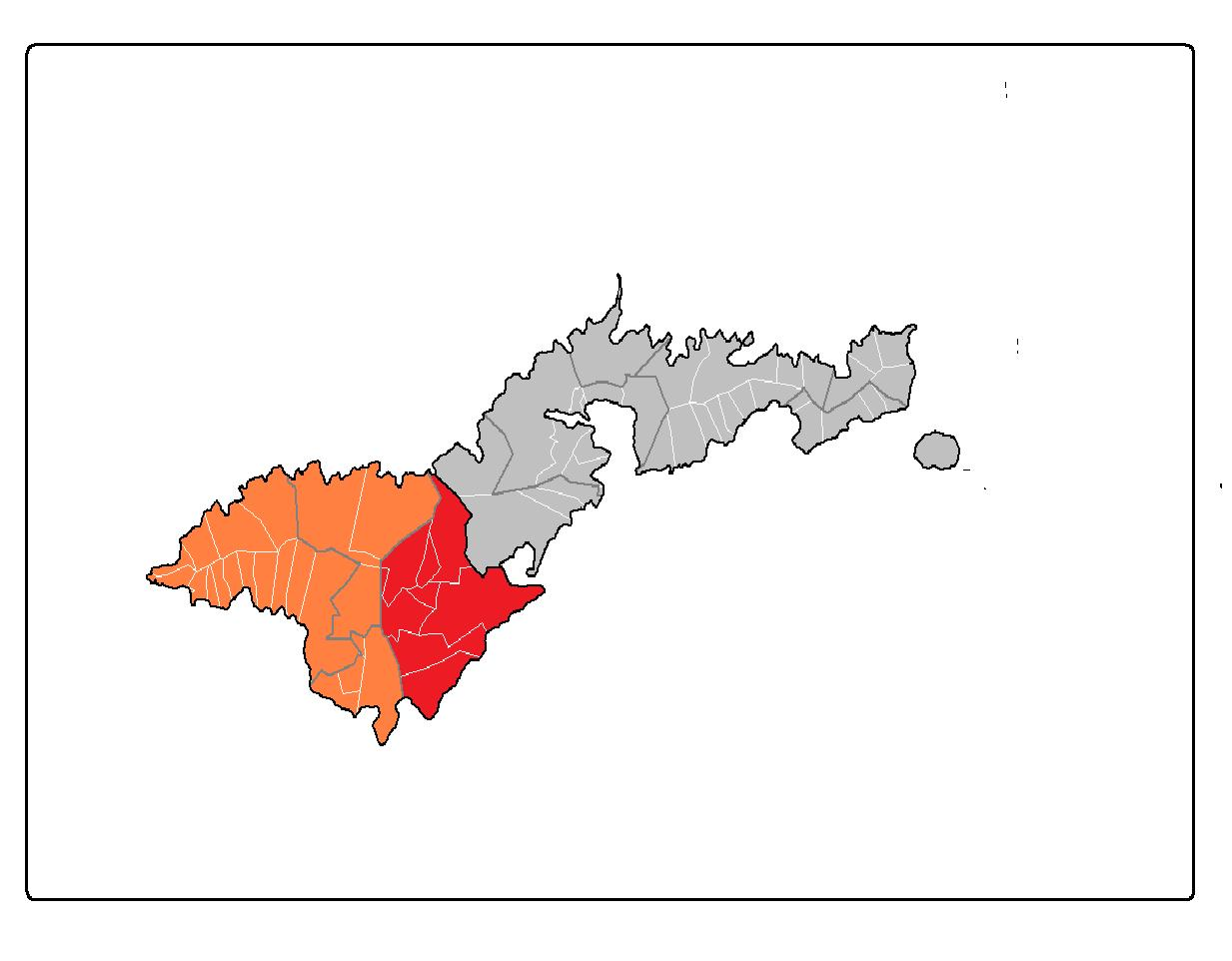
- Map of Tutuila where Tuālāuta County is highlighted in red, while the Western District is marked in orange.
- Country: United States
- Territory: American Samoa
- Island: Tutuila
- District: Western
- County seat: ʻIliʻili
- Largest city: Tāfuna

Area
  - Total: 9.91 sq mi (25.7 km^{2})

Population (2020)
  - Total: 22,827
  - Density: 2,300/sq mi (889/km^{2})
- Time zone: UTC−11 (Pacific Time Zone)
- ZIP code: 96799
- Area code: +1 684

Tuālāuta County is a county in the Western District in American Samoa. It is the largest and also the most populated county in American Samoa. The county is represented by two seats in the Senate and two seats in House of Representatives in the American Samoa Legislature. 'Ili'ili is the principal place in Tualauta County, a county which consists of 'Ili'ili, Pava'ia'i, Mapusaga, Faleniu, Mesepa, Malae'imi, Tafuna, and Vaitogi.

As of 2015, the county has a population of 19,519 residents. Tualauta County has the highest number of registered voters in American Samoa: 2,033 female voters and 1,660 male voters (3,693 total voters). However, in terms of votes cast in the 2016 election, more votes were cast in Maoputasi County. Tualauta County also has the highest number of voters between the ages of 18 and 35 with 2,105.

Tualauta County, which is the most populated county in American Samoa, had the highest number of housing units according to the 2010 U.S. census with 4,080 units, followed by 1,999 housing units for Maoputasi County. Tualauta County has experienced a large population increase and, as of the 2010 U.S. census, the county had over double the number of residents as Maoputasi County (home to the territorial capital of Pago Pago).

At 9.91 square miles (25.7 km^{2}), it is the largest county in American Samoa.

Tuālāuta contains most of Tutuila Island's flatland, including the Tafuna Plain.

== Etymology ==
The name of the county, Tuālāuta, is derived from the Samoan language and translates into English as “Inland Tuālā".

== History ==
In 1902, resistance to the copra tax emerged among Samoan communities, particularly within the Western District and notably in Tuālāuta County, an area that would later become a significant area for the Mau movement. In an effort to suppress this opposition, Governor Uriel Sebree detained three local chiefs to deter their supporters. Additionally, he dismissed a Samoan judge who had submitted a petition protesting the U.S. Navy's policies. In response to these actions, Governor Sebree characterized the Samoan populace as “grown-up children who love form and ceremony.”

In the early 1920s, Tuālāuta County, particularly the village of Faleniu, became a stronghold for the Mau movement. Faleniu served as the meeting place for the Faleniu conspirators, prompting Governor Waldo A. Evans to dispatch a posse that arrested 17 matais on charges of conspiracy and rebellion. Among the Mau’s prominent leaders was Magalei Siāsulu from Faleniu. The U.S. Navy charged him and several other matais with tax evasion, but they were released by Governor Edward Stanley Kellogg on November 14, 1925. The other arrested matais included Savea Motu, Mase, Siufanua, Noa, Liu, Tuiaana, Malufau, Ui, Sagapolutele, Fonoti, Tua, and Poloai — all from Tuālāuta County.

During the late 1940s and early 1950s, residents of Pavaʻiaʻi and Nuʻuuli initiated a period of rapid land acquisition in Tāfuna, transforming what had been largely undeveloped forest. Among the most prominent figures during this expansion was Otto Vincent Haleck, a resident of Pavaʻiaʻi at the time, who cleared land and staked extensive claims. By the end of the 1950s, Haleck had become the largest private landowner on Tutuila. Religious institutions were among the first major purchasers of his properties. The Congregational Christian Church in American Samoa (CCCAS) acquired 15 acres for the Kanana Fou theological complex, the Catholic Church purchased land that became Fatuoaiga, and the Assembly of God obtained four acres for its regional center. In 1998, the Church of Jesus Christ of Latter-day Saints purchased five acres for the establishment of a new stake. By 2000, Haleck was the largest rental property owner in American Samoa, and his development ventures included the Tradewinds Hotel, which opened that same year. He also maintained a private museum at his Aʻoloau-Tafeta estate, notable for displaying the nifo ‘oti used by High Orator Olo Letuli to ignite the torch at the 1997 South Pacific Mini Games opening ceremony held at Veterans Memorial Stadium.

== Demographics ==
Historical population
Year	Pop.	±%
1912	574	—
1920	651	+13.4%
1930	812	+24.7%
1940	944	+16.3%
1950	1,838	+94.7%
1960	2,141	+16.5%
1970	3,671	+71.5%
1980	6,855	+86.7%
1990	14,724	+114.8%
2000	22,025	+49.6%
2010	20,858	−5.3%
2020	22,827	+9.4%
U.S. Decennial Census

Tuālāuta County was first recorded beginning with the 1912 special census. Regular decennial censuses were taken beginning in 1920. Between 2010–2020, Tuālāuta was the only county in American Samoa to experience a population increase. The population here increased by 9.4 percent, while American Samoa as a whole experienced a 10.5 percent population decline. This large increase was largely due to a 57 percent population growth in the village of Mapusagafou. Population growth also occurred in Faleniu (2.9%) and in Tāfuna (0.5%). Population declines were seen in Pava'ia'i (−13.8%), Malaeimi (−11.5%), 'Ili'ili (−3.8%), and in Vaitogi (−1.9%).

== Villages ==
- Faleniu
- 'Ili'ili
- Mapusaga Fou
- Pava'ia'i
- Vaitogi
- Tāfuna
  - Ottoville
  - Fatuoaiga
- Malaeimi

== Landmarks ==
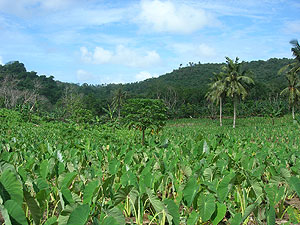
Fogāma'a Crater National Natural Landmark

- American Samoa Community College, in Mapusaga
- Cathedral of the Holy Family, in Tāfuna
- Fogāma'a Crater National Natural Landmark, in Vaitogi
- 'Ili'ili Golf Course, in 'Ili'ili
- Lions Park, in Tāfuna
- Pago Pago International Airport, in Tāfuna
- Tradewinds Hotel, at Ottoville
- Turtle and Shark site, in Vaitogi
- Tia Seu Lupe historical site, at Fatuoaiga
- Tony Solaita Baseball Field, in Tāfuna
- Veterans Memorial Stadium, in Tāfuna
