= Soccer in American Samoa =

Overview of soccer activity in American Samoa

- Country: American Samoa
- Governing body: Football Federation American Samoa
- National teams: men's national team women's national team

National competitions
- FFAS President's Cup

Club competitions
- FFAS Senior League; FFAS Women's National League

International competitions
- OFC Champions League; FIFA World Cup

The sport of soccer in American Samoa is governed by the Football Federation American Samoa (FFAS), the country's soccer association. It was founded in 1984, and affiliated to FIFA and to the OFC in 1998. It organizes the FFAS Senior League (the national men's domestic association football tournament), the FFAS Women's National League (the national women's domestic association football tournament), the men's national team and the women's national team.

American Samoa is one of the weakest association footballing nations in the world, due to both its small population base and the overwhelming popularity of American football, basketball and baseball in the islands.

== League Football ==
The American Samoan leagues are typically considered weak, with the small population and popularity of other sports strongly contributing to that. The FFAS Senior League was formed around 1980 though it is hard to know a reliable date. It is not confirmed either when the FFAS Women's National League formed, but there were clubs as early as 1987 and the league continues to this day.

The champions of the FFAS Senior League are eligible to take part in the OFC Champions League, though they have not always taken up the position. They compete in the preliminary round of the competition, with Utulei Youth gaining the territory's only victory to date in the 2016 edition. Otherwise they are limited to a handful of draws.

== International football ==
The men's team famously hold the distinction of suffering the largest official loss in international association football history, having been defeated by Australia 31–0 on April 11, 2001. At the time they had only recorded one victory in their history over Wallis and Futuna Islands in 1983 (3-0), when both teams were not yet members of FIFA (Wallis and Futuna Islands still is not).

That appearance at the 1983 South Pacific Games would be the men's team's international debut, though opportunities would remain limited, particularly until their FIFA recognized debut at the 1998 Polynesia Cup. Results would continue to be limited, though positives would come from both the OFC Nations Cup and the Pacific Games, with victories over Tonga and the Cook Islands. They would also achieve draws against the Cook Islands and Tuvalu. Their first official victory came in November 2011, defeating Tonga 2–1 in the first round of OFC World Cup Qualification to record their second international victory after 38 consecutive defeats. They have previously been ranked at the bottom of the FIFA Rankings but, as of August 2022 are ranked 188th.

The women's national team would debut at the 1998 OFC Women's Championship, losing 21-0 to Australia and 9-0 to Papua New Guinea. Appearances would be sporadic from then on, with their first draw coming against the Cook Islands in the 2007 Pacific Games. As of August 2022 they are ranked 142nd in the FIFA Women's World Rankings.

== American Samoa football venues ==
Stadium	Capacity	City
Veterans Memorial Stadium	5,000	Tafuna
Pago Park Soccer Stadium	2,000	Pago Pago
FFAS Tafuna Soccer Stadium (Planned)	800-1,000	Tafuna
