= Co-Cathedral of St. Joseph the Worker (Fagatogo, American Samoa) =

- Co-Cathedral of St. Joseph the Worker
- 14°16′46″S 170°41′24″W
- Location: Fagatogo, American Samoa, United States
- Denomination: Roman Catholic

History
- Status: Cathedral
- Dedication: Saint Joseph the Worker

Architecture
- Functional status: Active
- Completed: 1959

Administration
- Diocese: Samoa–Pago Pago

Clergy
- Bishop(s): Most Rev. Peter Brown, C.Ss.R. Most Rev. Kolio Etuale (Coadjutor Bishop)

The Co-Cathedral of St. Joseph the Worker is a cathedral of the Roman Catholic Church in American Samoa, a Territory of the United States. It is the mother church and co-seat of the bishop of the Diocese of Samoa–Pago Pago along with the Cathedral of the Holy Family in Tafuna. The church is located in the village of Fagatogo. It was completed in 1959 and was the only cathedral in the diocese until 1995 when Holy Family was consecrated.

== See also ==
- List of Catholic cathedrals in the United States
- List of cathedrals in the United States
