= ʻIliʻili, American Samoa =

ʻIliʻili
- Village
- Location within American Samoa
- Coordinates: 14°21′6″S 170°44′49″W
- Country: United States
- Territory: American Samoa

Area
  - Total: 1.38 sq mi (3.58 km^{2})

Population (2020)
  - Total: 3,073
  - Density: 2,220/sq mi (858/km^{2})

ʻIliʻili is a village in the southwest of Tutuila Island, American Samoa. It is located seven miles inland, southwest of Pago Pago, between the villages of Futiga and Vaitogi. It is in Tuālāuta County. As of the 2020 U.S. census, ʻIliʻili has a population of 3,073, making it the third-most populated village in American Samoa.

ʻIliʻili is home to American Samoa's only golf course, Lavalava Golf Course, which is an 18-hole golf course maintained by the Department of Parks and Recreation. It is 120 acres (49 ha). Fuga Tolani Teleso was released early from the U.S. Army at the request of the American Samoa Government to oversee the construction of the ʻIliʻili golf course. He successfully completed the golf course using volunteer labor and contributions from local businesses and golfers. Additionally, Teleso personally acquired land adjacent to the golf course to establish a golf pro shop.

The headquarters for the American Samoa district of the Samoa Mission of Seventh-day Adventists was relocated to ʻIliʻili in 1979. The village is the principal place of Tuālāuta County and lies somewhat inland from a precipitous coastline.

It is located on the Tafuna-Leone Plain less than one mile from the southern coastline of Tutuila.

== Etymology ==
The name is a tautonym and a palindrome. The name translates to “small pebbles” or just "pebbles".

== History ==
Historically, Aitūlagi was divided into two regions: the northern Tuālāuta and the southern Tuālātai. High Chief Letuli governed Tuālāuta from ʻIliʻili, making ʻIliʻili a central location of authority, while High Chief Satele oversaw Tuālātai from Vailoa.

ʻIliʻili was a notable location during World War II for the activities of U.S. military forces stationed in American Samoa. Situated near the island's western area, ʻIliʻili became a central point for logistical and strategic operations. The town of ʻIliʻili served as the headquarters for a portion of the tank company and the 3rd Platoon during the American military's deployment in Samoa. The troops utilized an abandoned church in ʻIliʻili as a maintenance shop and storage facility, repurposing the building to support their operational needs. ʻIliʻili was strategically significant due to its proximity to key infrastructure and its suitability for supporting infantry operations. The company headquarters and 3rd Platoon in ʻIliʻili played a role in maintaining and organizing military equipment as part of broader efforts to fortify the island against potential enemy advances. The village was also situated near key locations like the harbor and the developing airfield at Tafuna. This proximity made ʻIliʻili a practical site for staging logistical operations and housing essential military personnel.

== Culture ==
=== Religion ===
In September 2016, the pastor of the Antioch Assembly of God Church in ʻIliʻili, announced the start of a new bible college: King’s Leadership University. In 2013, a Word of Faith church was dedicated at ʻIliʻili. The American Samoa Seventh-Day Adventist Church (SDA) operates the Iakina Adventist Academy at ʻIliʻili which includes K5 to grade 12. ʻIliʻili is also home to the Potter’s House Christian Fellowship Church, an Anglican church, and a Baháʼí Center.

== Demographics ==
Year	Population
2020	3,073
2010	3,195
2000	2,513
1990	1,790
1980	970
1970	625
1960	388

== Notable residents ==
- Savali Talavou Ale – Speaker of the American Samoa House of Representatives (since 2007)
- Pita Elisara – American football offensive lineman
- A. P. Lutali – former Governor of American Samoa (1985–1989, 1993–1997)
- Tuiaʻana T. Letuli - representative (1952 - 57) and police chief (1957 - 1967)
- Susana Leiato Lutali – former First Lady of American Samoa (1985–1989, 1993–1997)
- Talofa Misiaita luta – community leader and U.S. Army Sergeant.
- Francis Mauigoa – American football offensive lineman for the New York Giants of the National Football League (NFL).
