= Tradewind (disambiguation) =

The trade winds are the permanent east-to-west prevailing winds that flow in the Earth's equatorial region.

Tradewind(s) or trade wind(s) may also refer to:

== Media ==
=== Books ===
- Trade Wind, a book by M. M. Kaye

=== Films ===
- Trade Winds (film), 1938 film directed by Tay Garnett
- Trade Wind, alternate name for the 1998 film At Sachem Farm
- Tradewind (The Incredibles), a superhero
- Tradewind Pictures, a German production company

=== Music ===
- The Trade Winds, a 1960s pop group
- Tradewinds, the original name of Styx
- "Trade Winds", a poem by John Masefield set to music in 1919 by Frederick Keel
- "Trade Winds", a song written in 1940 by Cliff Friend and Charles Tobias
- "Trade Winds", the B-side to the 1972 Roberta Flack single "The First Time Ever I Saw Your Face"
- "Tradewinds", a song from John Denver's 1977 album, I Want to Live
- "Trade Winds", a song by Natasha Barrett

=== Other media ===
- TradeWinds, a business newspaper covering ocean shipping
- Tradewinds, a video game franchise published by Sandlot Games

== Military and aviation ==
- Tradewind (schooner), a 1911 Dutch tall ship
- HMS Tradewind (P329), British submarine
- Convair R3Y Tradewind, an American 1950s heavy transport flying-boat
- Tradewinds Airlines, an American cargo carrier
- Tradewinds Charters and Tradewinds Airlines, former names of SilkAir, a Singaporean airline
  - Tradewinds Tours And Travel, a subsidiary
- Tradewinds Airways, a British cargo airline
- Tradewind Aviation, also Tradewind Shuttle, an American charter airline

== Places ==
- Tradewinds, Texas, a census-designated place
- Tradewinds Hotel, Ottoville, American Samoa
