= Gaea Pelefoti Failautusi =

American Samoan politician (1939–2023)

Gaea Pelefoti Failautusi (July 4, 1939 – June 2023) was an American Samoan politician and civil servant. Failautusi served as an American Samoa Senator representing the Tualauta District for one, four-year term during the 24th Legislature. He also served as Treasurer of the American Samoan government under Governor Togiola Tulafono. Gaea Pelefoti Failautusi was the father of First Lady of American Samoa Ella Failautusi Mauga and the father-in-law of Governor Lemanu Peleti Mauga.

== Biography ==
Failautusi was born on July 4, 1939. His mother, Tuipine Tufono, was from Aunuʻu island and Fagatogo, while his father's family, Failautusi Sifea Gaea, came from Vaitogi and the Manuʻa Islands. He was raised in the village of Vaitogi in Western District on the main island of Tutuila. Failautusi attended Le'ala Junior High School and graduated from the High School of American Samoa in 1961. He later earned a dual associate degree in accounting and business administration from American Samoa Community College in 1983 while working in the territorial auditing department. In 1976, he became a deacon in the Congregational Christian Church in American Samoa and was a longtime member of the CCCAS' Vaipuna o le Upu Moni Church in Vaitogi.

Failautusi began working for the American Samoan government in 1961 soon after his graduation from high school. He spent decades working in government auditing, treasury, and other departments.

In 1994, Gaea Pelefoti Failautusi was elected to the American Samoa Senate, representing the Tuālāuta District in Tuālāuta County. He served one, four-year term in the Senate from 1995 to 1999 during the 24th Legislature. During this time, he was a member of several Senate committees, including the Retirement Fund Committee.

In 2008, Failautusi was appointed Treasurer of the American Samoan government during the Togiola Tulafono administration. He served in that capacity until 2009, when he was appointed Internal Auditor for the Department of Treasury from 2009 to 2012.

Gaea Pelefoti Failautusi died in June 2023, at the age of 83. He was survived by his fifteen children, including First Lady Ella Failautusi Mauga, 44 grandchildren, and 33 great-grandchildren. He was predeceased by his wife, the late Patopae Liu Failautusi. Flags were lowered to half-staff on June 22 and 23, in his honor.
