= Letuli =

Letuli may refer to:

- Letuli Toloa (died 1996), American Samoa paramount chief and President of the American Samoa Senate
- Freddie Letuli (1919–2003), American Samoan fire knife dancer
- Tuiaʻana T. Letuli (1905–1967), American Samoan High Chief and politician
