= Tafuna, American Samoa =

- Village
- Tāfuna
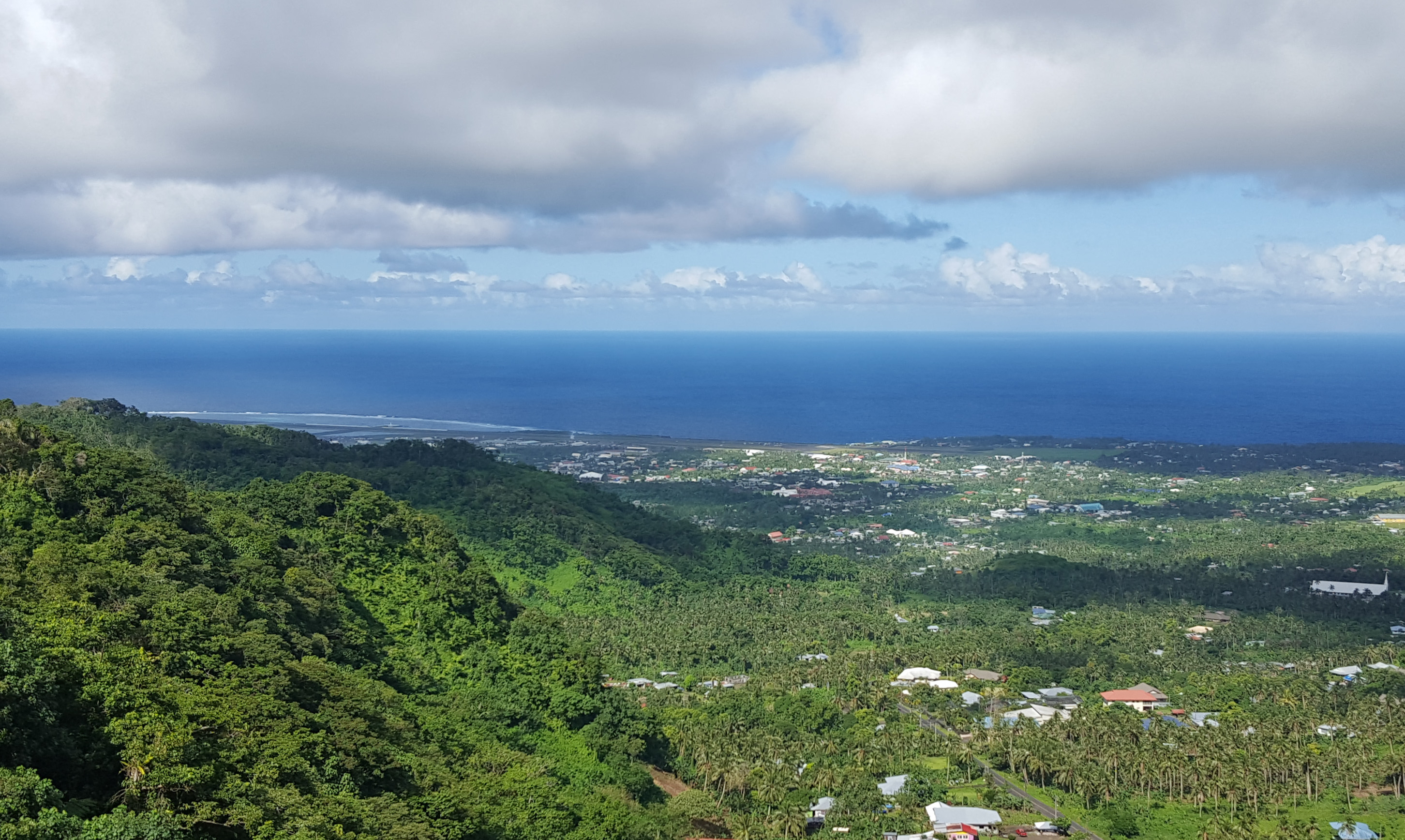
- Tafuna Airport seen from A'oloau
- Interactive map of Tafuna, American Samoa
- Location within American Samoa Location within Pacific Ocean
- Coordinates: 14°20′09″S 170°43′12″W
- Country: United States of America
- Territory: American Samoa
- County: Tuālāuta

Government
  - Mayor: Sefe Tau’ese

Area
  - Total: 2.53 sq mi (6.54 km^{2})

Population (2020)
  - Total: 7,988
  - Density: 3,190.5/sq mi (1,231.9/km^{2})
- ZIP code: 96799

Tafuna (Samoan: Tāfuna) is a village in Tualauta County, Western District, American Samoa. It is the most populous village in American Samoa, with a population of 7,988 according to the 2020 U.S. census.

Tafuna is the principal area for the development of housing and industry in American Samoa. It is one of the few places in American Samoa where the most freehold land is found. Public utilities, the international airport, and light industry are based on the Tafuna Plain. Tafuna's commercial strip is lined with businesses, government offices, recreational facilities, school institutions, service industries, and shops. It encompasses the constituent villages of Petesa, Faga'ima, Kokoland, and Ottoville.

== Etymology ==
The name Tāfuna is derivative of the Samoan word "fa'atāfuna".

Pre-Christian use of the word "fa'atāfuna" – destroy, havoc.

Modern use of the word "fa'atāfuna" – place where rubbish is burnt.

== History ==
Evidence from archaeological studies indicates that the Tāfuna Plain experienced volcanic activity as recently as 1,500 years ago. Chronological analyses suggest that human settlement on the plain had already begun between 245 and 745 BCE, albeit on a limited scale. The area was primarily used for subsistence gardens cultivating taro and bananas, as well as for pigeon hunting.

Tāfuna remained largely uninhabited for approximately 3,000 years. The area, characterized by a dense rainforest growing over an inhospitable lava shield, served primarily as a site for pigeon hunting and occasional warfare. This changed with the arrival of Western settlers (referred to locally as palangi), who used chainsaws and bulldozers to clear and level the land, transforming it for modern development.

In 1900, at the time of the Deed of Cession, Tafuna was and still is a traditional village of the Tualauta County with its own fa'alupega. It has since moved from its original location next to the Nu'uuli Pala Lagoon to areas further inland, now known as Tafunafou. The village was relocated during World War II to make way for the construction of Tafuna Airport.

In 1941, as the U.S. Navy prioritized the defense of American Samoa, Lt. Commander C. H. Derby oversaw operations in the territory. He advocated for constructing an airstrip in Tāfuna, a proposal that was ultimately approved. The site he recommended later became Tafuna Airport. During World War II, Tafuna Air Base was the second-largest military installation on Tutuila Island, second only to the long-established U.S. Naval Station Tutuila.

In the late 1940s and early 1950s, residents of Pavaʻiaʻi and Nuʻuuli initiated a land rush in Tāfuna. Otto Vincent Haleck, who lived in Pavaʻiaʻi at the time, participated by clearing forests and staking claims. By the end of the 1950s, Haleck had become the largest landowner on Tutuila Island. The Congregational Christian Church in American Samoa purchased 15 acres from him for the Kanana Fou site, the Catholic Church purchased land that became Fatuoaiga, the Assembly of God purchased four acres for their center, and in 1998, the Latter Day Saints purchased five acres to establish a new stake. By 2000, Haleck was the largest rental landlord in American Samoa. One of his notable development projects, the Tradewinds Hotel, was launched in 2000. He also owned a small museum at his Aʻoloau-Tafeta estate, which featured the nifo ‘oti used by High Orator Olo Letuli to light the Pacific Mini Games Torch at the Veterans Memorial Stadium in Tāfuna in 1997. The subvillage of Ottoville is named after him.

By 1982, the Congregational Christian Church in American Samoa (CCCAS) had developed into a financially stable and progressively managed church organization and began planning the construction of a church center in Tafuna, named Kanana Fou. By 1984, the first phase of the project was completed, which included church offices and housing for pastors.

In 1997, the Veterans Memorial Stadium was completed in Tafuna. Faced with hosting the 1997 South Pacific Mini Games without suitable facilities, Governor A. P. Lutali enlisted territorial resources and secured federal support to reappropriate US$1.4 million in 1996 capital-improvement funds to construct a stadium and all-weather track. Work commenced late in 1996 and concluded in July 1997, a month ahead of the opening. The Games convened at Tafuna for two weeks, drawing athletes from sixteen South Pacific nations to compete across eleven sports.

In 2016, visits by church ministries and NGOs led to the creation of a recording group at the Tafuna Correctional Facility (TCF). This was the prison’s first initiative of its kind, and the inmates’ albums were subsequently sold to the public.

In 2019, during the COVID-19 pandemic, the Catholic Church’s Fatuoaiga Pastoral and Cultural Center provided housing for suspected cases in American Samoa.

In 2019, the Catholic Church's Hazard Mitigation Project partnered with politician Larry Sanitoa, American Samoa Power Authority, and Paramount Builders to carry out essential road resurfacing in Fatuoaiga.

In October 2021, The Church of Jesus Christ of Latter-day Saints (LDS) held an official ground breaking ceremony for the construction of a LDS temple at Ottoville.

== Geography ==
The village of Tafuna compromises the eastern bulk of Tuālāuta County. Its defining geographical feature, the Tafuna Plain, is a Holocene era, 8.9 square miles (23 km^{2}) volcanic plain on Tutuila Island. Besides the plateau at A’oloaufou, the Tafuna-Leone Plain is the only major flat land on Tutuila Island. Late-stage volcanic eruptions formed the large flat plain. Near the Catholic church at Ottoville is an archeological park containing a well-preserved ancient Polynesian mound as well as a rainforest reserve.

=== Climate ===
The annual rainfall at Tafuna averages approximately 325 cm, while Pago Pago receives nearly 500 cm annually, representing a nearly 54% difference in precipitation levels. This significant disparity is due to the southeast trade winds, which carry moisture and rise above Rainmaker Mountain, causing heavy rainfall over the harbor area in Pago Pago. This climatic interaction makes Pago Pago one of the wettest locations on Earth.

=== Geology ===
The Tafuna-Leone Plain was formed during the most recent major volcanic activity in the region, which occurred approximately 3,000 to 4,000 years ago. This geological event resulted in extensive lava flows that shaped the Tafuna Plain, creating a distinctive landscape characterized by basaltic rock and minimal soil development.

== Economic activity ==
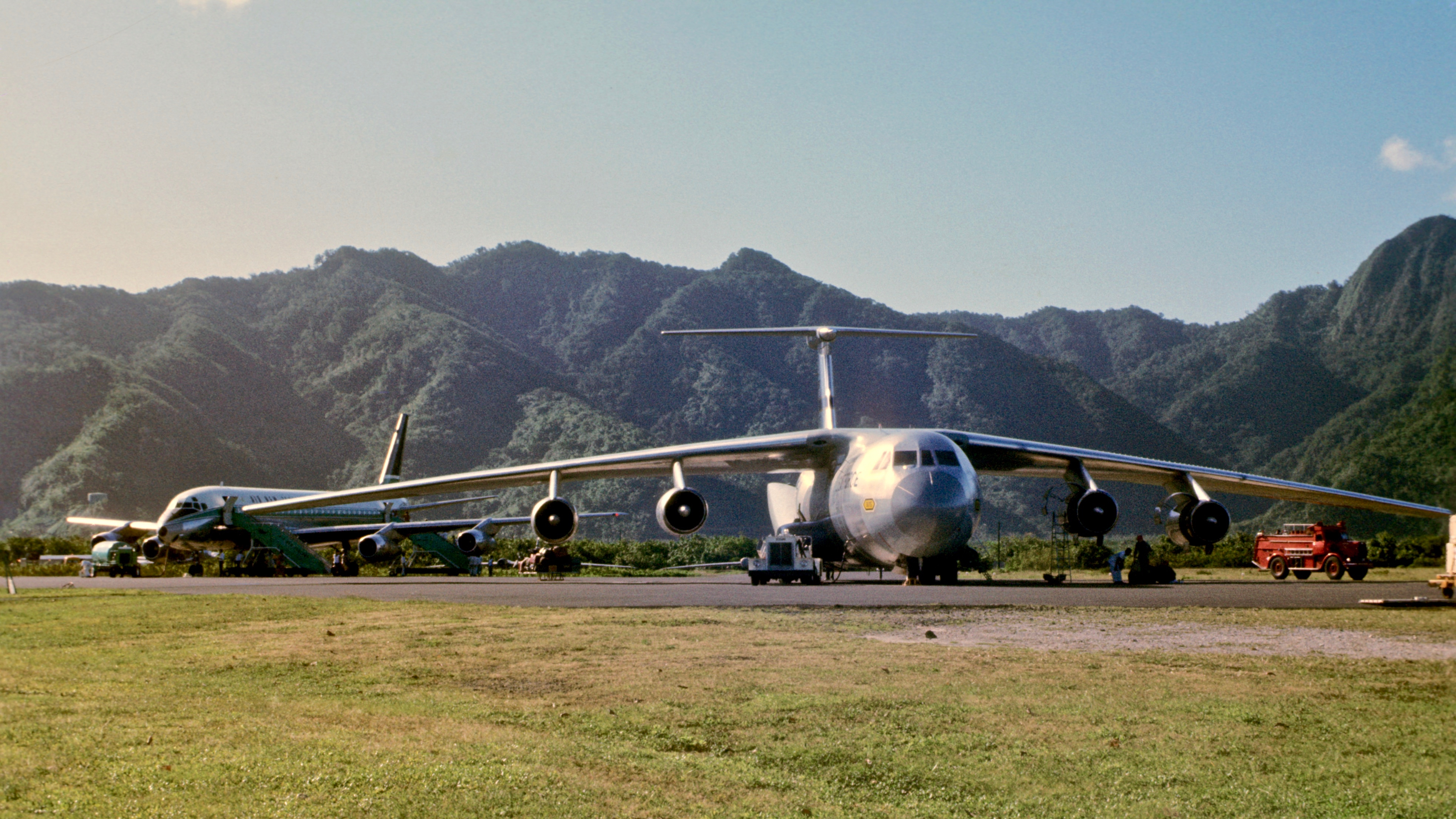
A USAF Military Airlift Command C-141 at Pago Pago International Airport on 24 July 1968

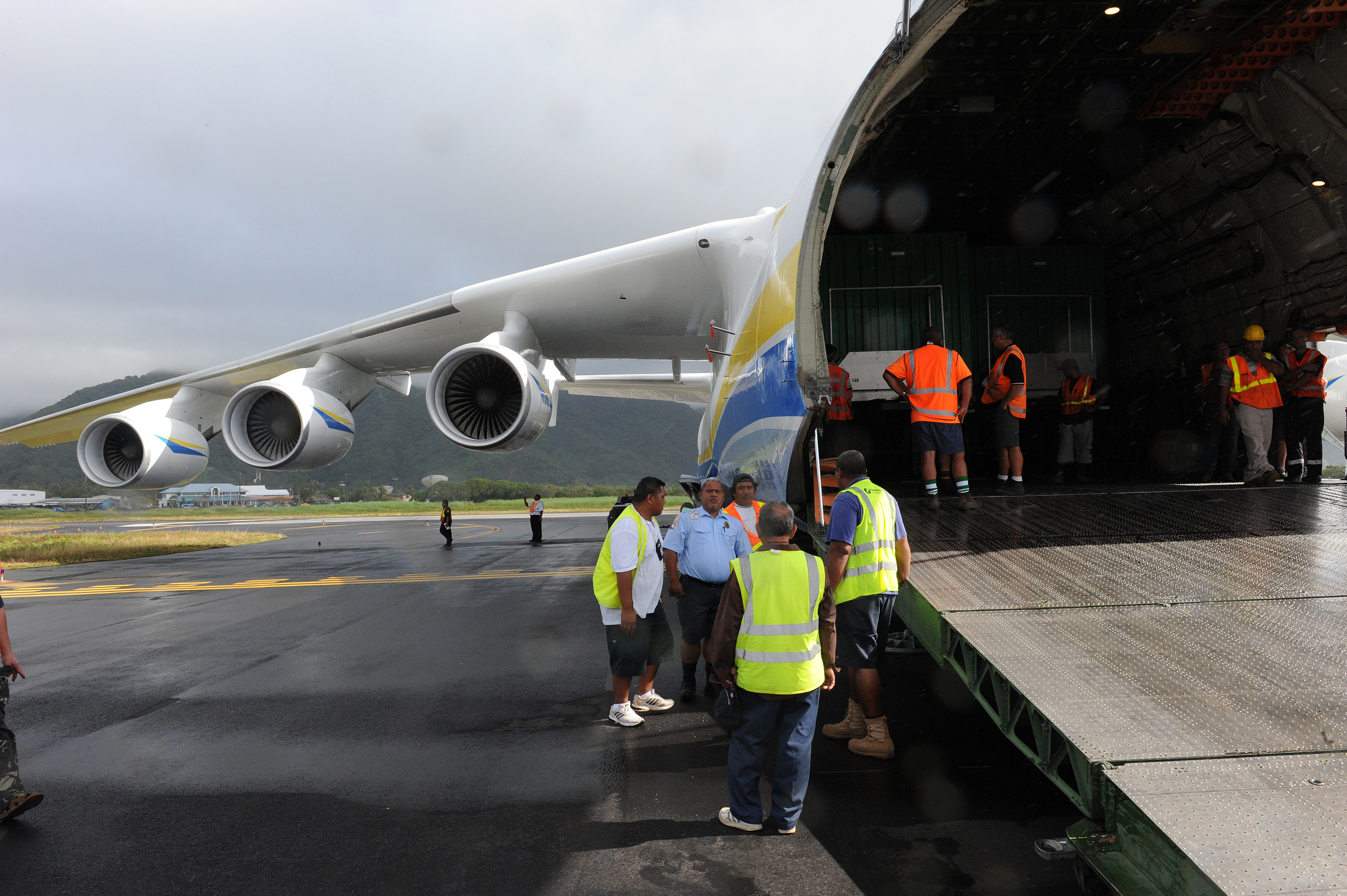
Logistics personnel at Tafuna Airport prepare to unload generators.

Tafuna holds a large concentration of businesses on the island. Popular American fast-food franchises such as McDonald's opened in Tafuna in the year 2000. The American Samoa Power Authority (ASPA) is headquartered in Tafuna. Island's Choice Dairy Factory, which produces dairy products ranging from ice cream to juices, is headquartered in Ottoville.

Tafuna Industrial Park (TIP), also known as Senator Daniel K. Inouye Industrial Park, is operated through the Department of Commerce and its Tafuna Industrial Park Panel. TIP is located on a 100-acre (40 ha) lot near Tafuna Airport.

=== International Airport ===
Tafuna International Airport (Pago Pago Airport) is located in Tafuna. Pago Pago International Airport has the headquarters of Inter Island Airways. The construction of an airport at the Tafuna Plain was one of the major consequences of the military buildup in the early 1940s. Bulldozers were used to scrape away and clear a thick jungle, and explosives were later utilized to blast away obstructions and fill underwater areas. In March 1942, the main runway at Tafuna was constructed. It was 200 feet (61 m) wide and 3,600 feet (1,100 m) long and available to use for the first Marine Air Group's arrival.

The first airplanes of Marine Air Group 13 landed at the nearly finished Tafuna Air Base on April 2, 1942. The area surrounding the airstrip was primitive and difficult, mostly consisting of dense jungle. Four days after the air group's arrival, the first runway at Tafuna was constructed by the Utah Construction Company with assistance from the Marine Corps. The Tafuna Airstrip was 2,500 feet (760 m) long and 250 feet (76 m) wide. On July 18, 1962, the first jet-plane, Pan Am Boeing 707, arrived at Tafuna International Airport, carrying Stewart Udall, the Secretary of the Interior. Tafuna International Airport was once a major stop for many airlines traveling the trans-pacific route until the extension of Faleolo International Airport.

=== Hospitality industry & Service industry ===
Tradewinds Hotel on Main Ottoville Road in Ottoville has a day spa, resort pool, tour desk, and ATM. It is also the home of Equator Restaurant where shows such as fiafia performances are held Friday nights. The hotel was built in 2003. Other hotels in Tafuna are Maliu Mai Beach Resort and Pago Airport Inn, which is a motel-style inn with a restaurant and swimming pool. The Bowling Sports Club and Flames Night Club are the two main nightclubs on island.

=== Other ===
A modern prison was built near the Tafuna Airport for 28 inmates in 1970. In September 2016, a new Tafuna government prison opened. The prison was built for male prisoners at a cost of approximately $4 million.

== Demographics ==
Year	Population
2020	7,988
2010	7,945
2000	8,409
1990	5,174
1980	1,086
1970	278
1960	126
1950	68
1940	68
1930	44
1920	28
1912	25

The population in American Samoa doubled from 1978 to 1997. Most of this population growth took place on the Tafuna Plain and in the Pago Pago area. Nearly all of American Samoa's commercial development lies in the perimeter around Pago Pago and on the Tafuna Plain.

As one of the few places in American Samoa that allow for the private purchase of land, Tafuna has become the largest village in American Samoa and a melting pot of residents with different nationalities. A substantial number of residents who live in Tafuna have immigrated from near and distant villages and districts. As of the 2020 U.S. census, Tafuna has more housing units than any other village in American Samoa, at 1,914 units.

== Culture ==
Tafuna is notable for its diverse population, including immigrants from Western Samoa, Korea, Fiji, the Philippines, Tonga, China, Europe, and mainland United States. Unlike other villages in American Samoa, much of Tafuna's land is privately owned rather than controlled by extended family groups, or aiga. This allows for the purchase and development of individual plots, as well as the rental of homes. The shift in land ownership patterns has significantly altered Tafuna's social structure. The traditional aiga-based authority, central to Samoan culture, holds less sway in the community. Consequently, the village council has a diminished role, and many residents live outside the matai (chiefly) system. This lack of adherence to traditional social frameworks has led to reduced social oversight compared to other areas, such as the Eastern District.

=== Religion ===
The Cathedral of the Holy Family (1986) located in the village is the episcopal see of the Roman Catholic Diocese of Samoa–Pago Pago. The Christian Church of American Samoa (CCCAS) made plans to construct a church center in Tafuna in 1982. Near the vicinity of the church center, Kanana Fou Private School was built in the village in 1979 for the Congregational Christian Church in American Samoa. The first phase of the construction of the center, which was named Kanana Fou, was completed by 1984. In 1997 a multimillion-dollar gymnasium and athletic facility was completed. Kanama Fou had now become a large religious center for seminars, conferences, athletic- and youth activities, and many more community uses. Tafuna also became the center of American Samoa's Catholic Church. Construction began on the cathedral, church hall, dormitories, and other support buildings in the 1980s and 1990s. Construction of the new complex, known as Fatu O Aiga, was completed at the cost of $3 million. The Holy Family Cathedral at Fatuoaiga has a display of wood-carvings by artist Sven Ortquist.

The Congregational Christian Church in American Samoa (CCCAS) holds its general meetings biennially each July at the Kanana Fou center in Tafuna. The Tafuna compound features multiple buildings designated for each respective matagaluega/pulega, providing accommodation for their representatives during the meetings. Additionally, the center occasionally hosts football, rugby, and other sporting competitions. The compound also includes the church’s educational institutions: Kanafou High School, Elementary School, and Early Childhood Education (ECE) programs. The Kanafou Theological Seminary, which was inaugurated in 1983, is located inside the CCCAS Center at Kanafou.

The Seventh Day Adventist Maranatha Multicultural Church is an English-speaking at Tafuna. The Samoa Independent Seventh-Day Adventist Church (SISDAC) dedicated a new gymnasium in Ottoville in May 2016. Tafuna is also home to a Bahai Center, Tafuna Methodist Church, and the American Samoa branch of the Samoa Worship Center Christian Church. Rev. Elder Dr. Pati Pia’i Vaeao, president of the First Samoan Full Gospel Pentecostal Church (FSFGC), established the Peteli Academy at Ottoville in 2004. In 1994, the Tafuna Church of Christ was established.

== Education ==
Tafuna High School is the largest, most urban, and also the most cosmopolitan high school in American Samoa. It opened in 1982 with a total of 100 enrolled students. It is the newest of the five public high schools in American Samoa and had 1,200 enrolled students as of 2018. The high school's football team practices on a rippled grass expanse in the center of the high school campus. The Tafuna Warriors football team experienced a championship streak from 2011 to 2013 in the American Samoa High School Athletics Association (ASHSAA) football. The team also claimed both the 2018 Varsity and Junior Varsity championship titles, with undefeated records in both divisions.

Currently, the only university with a campus in American Samoa, Wayland Baptist University, is located in Tafuna. It offers bachelor degrees in various fields.

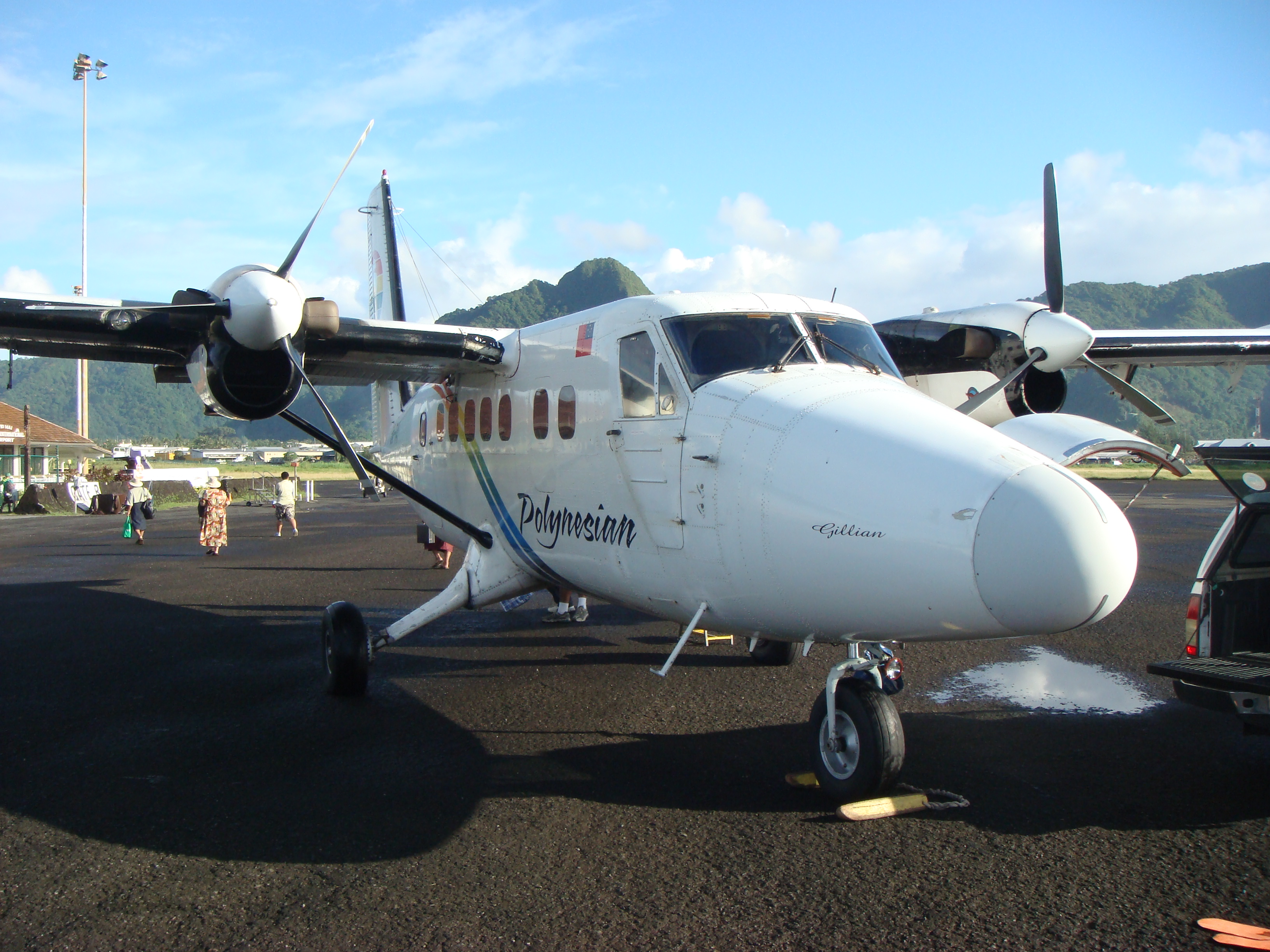

== Attractions ==
Tafuna is home to the most accessible of American Samoa's star mounds, known as Tia Seu Lupe. This can be seen right behind the statue of St. Mary near the large Catholic cathedral. The name literally translates to "earthen mound to catch pigeons." The star mound is almost 10 feet (3.0 m) high and is one of the best-preserved mounds on the island. It is believed to have been used in rituals by tribal chiefs to capture pigeons for an unknown rite. Similar step-stone mounds can be found throughout Polynesia.

The Holy Family Catholic Cathedral, built in 1994, is situated at the Ottoville district on the Tafuna Plain. It contains a picture of the Holy Family on a Samoan beach painted by Duffy Sheridan in 1991. Samoan artist Sven Ortquist did the fourteen deep-relief Stations of the Cross and other woodcarvings and also designed the stained glass windows. Adjacent to the Fatuoaiga Catholic Church Center is a historic park with restored tia seu lupe (a pigeon-catching mound) that resembles the later marae of Eastern Polynesia. The park is located next to the only part of low-land rainforest still found on Tutuila Island.

Lions Park sits along the Pala Lagoon in Tafuna and is a public park under the jurisdiction of American Samoa Government Parks and Recreation. Recreational use of Pala Lagoon is centered around Lions Park. The park is home to picnic tables, tennis courts, and a children's playground. Canoes, rafts, and kayaks are launched from the park. The Pala Lagoon Swimming Center is a community swimming pool at Lions Park which was built in 2017. Pala Lagoon Swim Center has three swimming pools, water slides, and a splash pad. Next to the swim center is Lion's Park, which consists of tennis courts, a playground, a basketball court, and volleyball nets. There are also several fales with grills and picnic tables.

=== Landmarks ===
- Veterans Memorial Stadium
- Cathedral of the Holy Family
- Tradewinds Hotel
- Lions Park
- Tia Seu Lupe historical site at Fatuoaiga
- Tony Sola'ita Baseball Field
- DYWA Gym
- Pacific Horizon School
- Tafuna Elementary
- South Pacific Academy
- Kanana Fou High School
- Nu'u'uli Vo-Tech High School
- Tafuna High School
- American Samoa US Army Reserve Center (AS004)

== Flora ==
Due to population pressures, including the demands for housing and agriculture, the native coastal and lowland rainforest of the Tafuna Plain has been almost entirely cleared. The Tava (Pometia pinnata) lowland forest once blanketed the entire Tafuna-Leone Plain. This forest originally thrived on a geologically recent lava flow, estimated to be approximately 3,000 years old. The area is characterized by a thin layer of soil overlaying minimally weathered basalt rock. Today, nearly all of this forest has been destroyed or significantly disturbed, leaving only remnants of its original expanse.

Mangrove forests play a crucial role in stabilizing shorelines and act as natural barriers against hurricanes and storm waves. They also serve as vital breeding habitats for inshore fish species. In American Samoa, the most significant remaining mangrove forests are located at Tafuna, Masefau, and Aunu'u Island. The largest and most prominent of these is Pala Lagoon, situated between Nu'uuli and Tafuna, which represents the most extensive mangrove ecosystem in the region.

== Fauna ==
The Bristle-thighed curlew, the largest shorebird in the Samoan Islands, is occasionally observed near the airport, along with the more common Wandering tattler and the Sooty tern. In the surrounding area, the Banded rail inhabits lowland areas and is particularly noticeable near Tafunafou. Reptiles like the widely distributed House gecko and the Polynesian gecko are common in Tafuna, while the rare Cattle egret has also been spotted in the area. Mammals such as the House mouse and Brown rat have been reported in several parts of Tafuna, including Tafunafou. The Red-vented bulbul has been a common sight at Tafuna.

The Barn Owl, the only bird of prey in American Samoa, is frequently seen in Tafuna's plantation lands west of the airport, often perched on electric lines or flying along the coastal road.

The Red-vented bulbul is believed to have been introduced to Tutuila in 1957, with the first recorded sighting in Pago Pago in 1961. The species is thought to have arrived via aircraft and initially established itself on the Tafuna Plain.

== Notable people ==
- Jonathan Fanene, former NFL player
- Frankie Luvu, NFL player
- Junior Siavii, former NFL player
- Destiny Vaeao, NFL player
- Tony Solaita, baseball player, died in Tafuna
