= FFAS Tafuna Soccer Stadium =

Planned stadium in Tafuna, American Samoa

- Interactive map of FFAS Tafuna Soccer Stadium
- Location: Tafuna, American Samoa
- Coordinates: 14.3319°S 170.7215°W
- Capacity: 800-1000
- Surface: artificial turf

Construction
- Cost: $5 million

Tenants
- American Samoa national football team FFAS Senior League

The FFAS Tafuna Soccer Stadium is a planned association football stadium currently under construction in Tafuna, American Samoa. Once complete, it will replace Pago Park Soccer Stadium as the Football Federation American Samoa's main venue. The stadium will feature an artificial turf surface and meet FIFA international standards.

== History ==
During a summer 2023 visit around Oceania, FIFA president Gianni Infantino announced that the Football Federation American Samoa would receive $ 5 million for the construction of a new soccer stadium for the island. Shortly thereafter, a plot of land next between the Tony Solaita Baseball Field and Veterans Memorial Stadium in Tafuna, the island's largest town, was selected. The new stadium would replace the Pago Park Soccer Stadium, as the former venue in the capital did not meet all of the association's needs because of its location. Events were limited to daylight hours because of the town's curfew and ban on floodlighting which would disturb the surrounding residents.

The project was significantly delayed because of land disputes and leasing agreements to be resolved with the American Samoa government with the football association receiving only part of the plot of land originally set aside for the project. Following the resolution of the disputes, a 55-year lease was signed by the FFAS and approved by a special session of the Fono on November 13, 2023. In April 2024, the earthworks began on the property between the Memorial Stadium and the Tony Solaita Baseball Field. FFAS President Faiivae Iuli Alex Godinet stated that he hoped the turf fields would be complete by September 2024. It was also announced that upgrades would be made to the Pago Park Soccer Stadium.

In August 2024, the FFAS sought an expression of interest for project manager for the 800 to 1000-seat stadium. At that time it was announced that a bid for construction of the venue would be posted within four weeks of hiring the project manager. By August of the following year, the association had announced Roy Mallari, owner of RM Construction, as the Project Manager. RM Construction was finalizing the design and bids were expected to begin the following month. The association president, Faiivae Alex Iuli, hoped to hire a local company to build the stadium since contractors from abroad were typically hired for similar projects. At that time, it was expected that construction would begin in the next few months.
