= Ottoville, American Samoa =

- Subdivision, or district
- Location within American Samoa
- Coordinates: 14°20′1″S 170°43′53″W
- Country: United States
- Territory: American Samoa
- Village: Tafuna

Ottoville is a subdivision or district within the village of Tafuna, American Samoa.

At Ottoville is the Cathedral of the Holy Family. It contains a picture of the Holy Family on a Samoan beach painted in 1991 by artist Duffy Sheridan. It also includes a 14 deep-relief Stations of the Cross and other woodcarvings made by artist Sven Ortquist, who also designed the cathedral's stained glass windows.

Near the Cathedral of the Holy Family and next to the Fatuoaiga Catholic Church is a historical and archeological park which houses a restored Tia Seu Lupe. The park and Tia Seu Lupe Historic Monument was dedicated by Governor Peter Tali Coleman in May 1990. The park sits next to a rainforest reserve. This reserve is home to the only low-land rainforest still found on Tutuila Island.

After the 2009 tsunami, a temporary visitor center for the National Park Service was opened in Ottoville.

As of 2021, Ottoville was one of few areas on Tutuila Island where there were street signs (Ottoville Road). In Ottoville is also Tradewinds Hotel and connecting Equator Restaurant. The hotel has the highest standards on the island, and is also home to a swimming pool and several luxury suites. The hotel offers organized tours of the island the frequently hosts cultural performances on its pavilion. Ottoville is also home to a number of stately homes, rental apartments, modest homes, mini-marts, sewing shops, and warehouses.

== Etymology ==
Ottoville derives its name from Otto Haleck, who cultivated the land that now constitutes the area. Haleck engaged in the agricultural production of giant taro (taamu) and pineapples, envisioning the site as a future communal gathering space for the territory.

== Geography ==
=== Ottoville Rainforest ===
As of 2002, nearly all forest on the Tafuna Plain had been destroyed, with the exception of the 20-acre (8.1 ha) tract at Ottoville, which was under threat. Ottoville Lowland Forest is a 20-acre (8.1 ha) forest reserve situated in central Tafuna Plain, bordered by the Fatuaiga Catholic Compound in the south, and the Ottoville Road and Kanana Fou Theological Seminary in the east. It borders the Kokoland area of Tafuna in the north. The rainforest is dominated by vegetation such as mamalava, tava (Pometia pinnata), and maota trees (Dysoxylum maota). It is the only area remaining of native forest vegetation on the Tafuna Plain. Fourteen bird species have been recorded in the forest, including the common Red-vented Bulbul and the Jungle Myna, which are likely to breed in the forest. Common Myna is abundant in surrounding areas. It is home to the only roost of the White-necked Fruit Bat on the Tafuna Plain.

== Tourism ==
Tradewinds Hotel has a day spa, resort pool, ATM, car rental, and tour desk. Traditional dancing performances known as fiafia are held here on Friday nights. Equator Restaurant is located at the Tradewinds Hotel and is named for the ship which brought Robert Louis Stevenson to the South Pacific Ocean. The restaurant serves Southern-style shrimp sandwiches, Hawaiian saimin, hamburgers, chicken quesadillas, and more. An additional eatery in Ottoville is Jeffrey's Bar and Grill, which is located near Cost-U-Less and only a five-minute walk away from the Quality Inn Tradewinds Hotel. This restaurant specializes in steaks, but also serves all-day breakfasts, chicken, fish, salads, sandwiches, etc.

== Points of interest ==
- Holy Family Catholic Cathedral
- Tia Seu Lupe Historic Monument
- Jeffrey's Bar and Grill
- Tradewinds Hotel
  - Equator Restaurant
- Church of Jesus Christ of Latter-day Saints at Ottoville
