= Tafuna High School =

Secondary school in American Samoa

- Tafuna, Tuālāuta, American Samoa; United States

Information
- Type: Public High School
- Established: 1982
- Principal: Tutuila Togilau
- Grades: 9-12
- Enrollment: 1,000+ Annually
- Colors: Maroon; White Gold
- Mascot: Warriors
- Nickname: Warrior Nation

Tafuna High School (THS) is a public high school located in the village of Tafuna, Tuālāuta County, Western District, American Samoa. It is one of the 6 public high schools under the jurisdiction of the American Samoa Department of Education. The school opened in 1982 and welcomed a 100 freshmen. Its enrollment grew to at least 1,000 annually since the early 2000's. It is the largest public high school in American Samoa.

== History ==
On March 18, 1966, Governor H. Rex Lee announced that the local government signed an agreement with the US Air Force to provide half a million dollars to build a transit dormitory for military men and women. This building would later be utilized as a classroom setting for various subjects taught at Tafuna High School. On October 19, 2018, the historic site would be demolished in dedication of a new two-story, 10-classroom building.

Tafuna High School was established in 1982 and would have its first-graduating class in 1986. By the 90's, it was the fastest-growing school in the public school system.

In 2020, the then-Governor Lolo Matalasi Moliga had plans to relocate the E-rate office of DOE to the lower campus of Tafuna High School. This would mean that the high school would lose its lower campus that housed its JROTC program. A peaceful protest and a petition from the school PTA ensued in hopes of the decision being rescinded. After an on-site visit of the lower campus in October 30, 2020, the Governor agreed to return the campus to Tafuna High School for future use.

Tafuna High School's 50th anniversary (Golden Jubilee) will be held in the year 2032.

== Athletics ==
Tafuna competes in American Samoa High School Athletic Association (ASHSAA) sports such as football, volleyball, basketball, baseball, and soccer.

=== Football ===
Tafuna's first football championship title came in the 1996-97 football season, a title it shared with Samoana as the championship game of that year concluded in a draw. As of 2026, Tafuna has won 13 varsity football championship titles out of its 19 championship appearances. Its JV football program also has seen success, having secured 15 championship titles. Tafuna is also notably the only ASHSAA football team to have won seven-consecutive varsity football championship titles.

Championship Appearances
Year	Championship / Division	Result	Opponent	Score	Notes
1996	ASHSAA Varsity Football	Won	Samoana High School	-	First Championship Title
2004	ASHSAA Varsity Football	Lost	Fagaitua High School	-	
2005	ASHSAA Varsity Football	Won	Leone High School	-	Undefeated season
2009	ASHSAA Varsity Football	Lost	Samoana High School	7-6	
2010	ASHSAA Varsity Football	Won	Fagaitua High School	36-6	
2011	ASHSAA Varsity Football	Lost	Fagaitua High School	32-28	
2012	ASHSAA Varsity Football	Won	Leone High School	34-6	Undefeated season
2013	ASHSAA Varsity Football	Won	Samoana High School	44-6	Undefeated season; back-to-back champions
2014	ASHSAA Varsity Football	Lost	Fagaitua High School	24-22	Undefeated season
2016	ASHSAA Varsity Football	Lost	Fagaitua High School	38-28	
2017	ASHSAA Varsity Football	Lost	Samoana High School	7-6	
2018	ASHSAA Varsity Football	Won	Fagaitua High School	34-31	Undefeated season
2020	ASHSAA Varsity Football	Won	Samoana High School	25-12	Undefeated season
2021	ASHSAA Varsity Football	Won	Samoana High School	22-11	Undefeated season; back-to-back champions
2022	ASHSAA Varsity Football	Won	Leone High School	36-16	3-Peat Champions
2023	ASHSAA Varsity Football	Won	Leone High School	44-20	4-Peat Champions
2024	ASHSAA Varsity Football	Won	Leone High School	40-0	Undefeated season; 5-Peat Champions
2025	ASHSAA Varsity Football	Won	Fagaitua High School	46-6	6-Peat Champions
2026	ASHSAA Varsity Football	Won	Fagaitua High School	34-20	7-Peat Champions

== Academics ==
In 2017, the Tafuna JROTC team competed in the 8th Annual Academic Challenge and placed first in the LET I division, beating 46 teams across the nation, Asia and other territories that participated in the event. In the 2023 JPA, the JROTC program earned the Gold-Star distinction award after topping the 5 JROTC programs on island with an overall score of 99.13%. In April 2023, THS swept the top 3 spots in the NHD islandwide competition and were the overall champions for the 7th year in a row. It was also the 2025 Secondary School Speech Festival winner, securing 1st place for the 5th year in a row.Tafuna High School's JROTC aerial drone team, Toa Drones II (Team 96799B), claimed the All-Around Champions title at the 8th Brigade Aerial Drone Competition (held from February 21-22, 2025) in Reno, Nevada.In 2026,Tafuna were 3-peat Music Festival Champions.

== Notable Alumni ==
- Frankie Luvu - a standout NFL linebacker who has played for the New York Jets, Carolina Panthers, and Washington Commanders
- Destiny Vaeao - a former defensive tackle who played in the NFL for the Philadelphia Eagles and was part of the Super Bowl LII championship team
