= List of lakes of American Samoa =

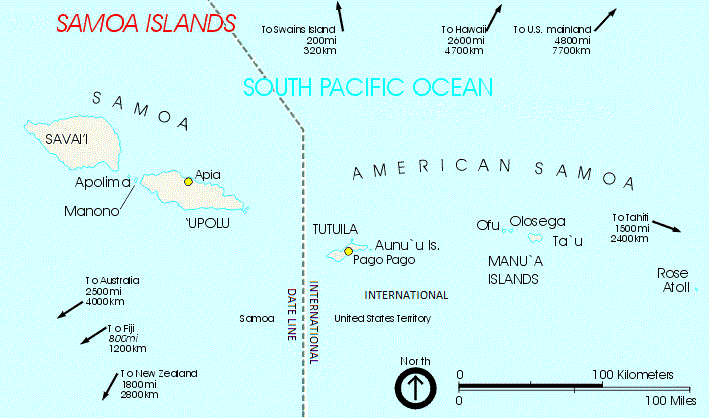
Samoa Islands

American Samoa is made up of five main volcanic islands and two coral atolls. American Samoa has a limited supply of drinking water.

== Lakes ==
- Crater Lake
- Faimuliuai Lake
- Lake Fiti
- Lake Namo
- Pala "Mud" Lake
- Pala Lagoon
- Lake Olomaga
- Red Lake
