= Sven Ortquist =

Samoan artist and sculptor (1938–2013)

Sven V. Ortquist (Apia, January 16, 1938 – Seattle, June 15, 2013) was a Samoan artist, wood-carver, and sculptor. Besides a carver, he was a boat builder, book illustrator, and painter. He has been awarded the Consortium for Pacific Arts and Cultures’ Heritage Award and the Governor’s Award for Excellence in the Arts. He has been the Master Carver for the American Samoa Council on Arts, Culture and the Humanities. He has also been the resident artist at Jean P. Haydon Museum. Ortquist was the founder and first president of the Samoan Voyaging Society, Aiga Tautai o Samoa. Ortquist has been an artist-in-residence at the territory’s largest college, American Samoa Community College and has also worked with a United Nations program teaching and constructing cheap plywood fishing boats for the poor.

Ortquist was born in Western Samoa and is the son of a Swedish coconut trader, Gustav Adolph Ortquist, and a Samoan mother, Muimui Vale from Vailima. His father first came from Sweden to Apia, Samoa in order to work as an accountant.

Ortquist was profiled in the documentary “The Samoan Heart” (1996).

== Artwork ==
His first major project was to turn a three-inch high Italian picture of St. Joseph the Worker into a life-size statue. The project was commissioned by a church hospital in Fiji.

One of his many works includes the painted mural in front of the museum in Fagatogo. The artwork, which depicts the legend of Tagaloa and Pava, is on the exterior wall of the Jean P. Haydon Museum.

One of his most famous works is located at the Holy Family Cathedral at Fatuoaiga. Ortquist and his son Jude have carved the statues of the cross and altar inside the cathedral, along with the tapa design which decorates the columns and the nativity fale outside.

Besides the woodcarvings, Ortquist also designed the cathedral’s stained glass windows.
