= Diocese of Samoa–Pago Pago =

Latin Catholic diocese in American Samoa

Coordinates: 14.24°S 170.14°W

Diocese of Samoa–Pago Pago Diœcesis Samoa–Pagopagensis
- Coat of arms

Location
- Country: United States
- Territory: American Samoa
- Ecclesiastical province: Samoa-Apia

Statistics
- Area: 76 sq mi (200 km^{2})
- Population: Total; Catholics: (as of 2010); 68,000; 14,000 (20.6%)
- Parishes: 16

Information
- Denomination: Catholic
- Sui iuris church: Latin Church
- Rite: Roman Rite
- Established: 10 September 1982 (44 years ago)
- Cathedral: Cathedral of the Holy Family (Tafuna)
- Co-cathedral: Co-Cathedral of St. Joseph the Worker (Fagatogo)

Current leadership
- Pope: Leo XIV
- Bishop: Kolio Etuale
- Metropolitan Archbishop: Mosese Vitolio Tui
- Bishops emeritus: Peter Brown

Map
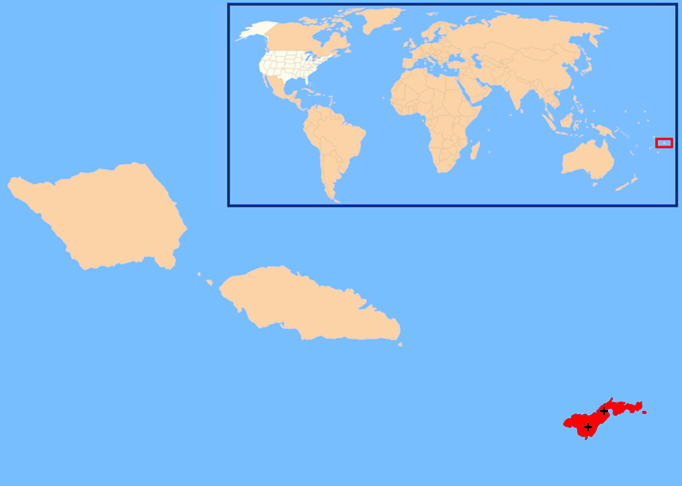

The Diocese of Samoa–Pago Pago (Latin: Diœcesis Samoa–Pagopagensis) is a Catholic suffragan diocese of the overseas dependency of American Samoa, in the ecclesiastical province of the Archdiocese of Samoa–Apia.

The see church is the Cathedral of the Holy Family in Tafuna. Kolio Etuale Tumanuvao, is bishop.

== History ==
It was canonically erected on 10 September 1982, from a unified diocese of Samoa and Tokelau, the bulk of which became its present metropolitan. Pope Paul VI visited the diocese in November, 1970.

== Leadership ==
Apostolic administrator

- Cardinal Pio Taofinuʻu (1982–1986)

Bishops

- John Quinn Weitzel (1986–2013)
- Peter Brown (2013–2023)
- Kolio Etuale (2023–present)

== Sources and external links ==
- Roman Catholic Diocese of Samoa–Pago Pago Official Site
