= Tuiaʻana T. Letuli =

American Samoan politician

Tuiaʻana Tafu Letuli

Member of the House of Representatives
- In office 1952–1957
- Constituency: Tuālāuta County

Personal details
- Born: 5 August 1905 ʻIliʻili, American Samoa
- Died: 13 May 1967 (aged 61) Honolulu, United States

Tuiaʻana Tafu Letuli (5 August 1905 – 13 May 1967) was an American Samoan High Chief and politician. He served as a member of the American Samoa House of Representatives between 1952 and 1957, and then as Chief of Police from 1957 until his death in 1967.

== Biography ==
Letuli was born in ʻIliʻili. He served in the United States Navy between June 1931 and June 1951 and became a member of the American Samoa House of Representatives, serving until 1957. He represented Tuālāuta County. He then became Chief of Police.

Letuli died on 13 May 1967 at the age of 61 during a trip to Honolulu to see three American Samoan officers graduate from the Honolulu Police Academy.
