= Pala Lagoon =

Lagoon in the United States territory American Samoa

- Location within American Samoa
- Location: Tutuila Island, American Samoa, United States
- Coordinates: 14.32°S 170.71°W
- Type: Natural
- Surface area: 480 acres (1,900,000 m^{2})
- Max. depth: 5 feet (1.5 m)

Pala Lagoon is an indentation in the south coast of Tutuila Island in American Samoa. The villages of Nuʻuuli and Tafuna are located on its shore. Pala Lagoon is approximately one mile across and has a surface area of around 75 square miles (190 km^{2}) The lagoon's depth varies from 1 foot (0.30 m)-5 feet (1.5 m) depending on the tide. The deepest areas of the lagoon were dredged when the Tafuna Airport runway was built in the 1960s. The entrance to the lagoon is about 1,200 feet (370 m) wide with a shallow reef top 1 foot (0.30 m)-3 feet (0.91 m) in depth. Along the northern and eastern shores, a 90-acre (36 ha) forest is located with red and oriental mangroves. The lagoon's northern shore has various streams which discharge into Pala Lagoon. The largest streams are Papa and Vaitele. There is a public recreation area known as Lions Park on the western edge of the lagoon, in the village of Tafuna. Pala Lagoon is also utilized for fishing and crabbing on a daily basis. It is a very important nursery and spawning ground for many fish and invertebrates found on the reef.

Pala Lagoon is situated next to the runway at Tafuna Airport. The lagoon contains the biggest and best preserved mangrove system on Tutuila Island.

== See also ==
List of lakes in American Samoa
