= Pavaʻiaʻi, American Samoa =

Coordinates: 14.336°S 170.752°W

Pavaʻiaʻi
- Village
- Location within American Samoa
- Country: United States
- Territory: American Samoa
- County: Tuālāuta

Area
  - Land: 0.73 sq mi (1.89 km^{2})

Population (2020)
  - Total: 2,112
  - Density: 2,890/sq mi (1,120/km^{2})
- ZIP code: 96799

Pavaʻiaʻi is a village in the Western District of Tutuila Island in American Samoa. It borders Mapasagafou and Faleniu to the north, ʻIliʻili to the east, Futiga to the south, and Malaeloa to the west. It is located in Tuālāuta County.

Pavaʻiaʻi is home to several fales that are used by villagers for dance practice, meetings, faʻalavelaves, and other events. It is also home to Pavaʻiaʻi Elementary School, the largest elementary school in American Samoa.

== History ==
In 1905, Pavaʻiaʻi - along with Leone - was among the first two villages in American Sāmoa to complete properly protected waterworks.

In early 1942, the main body of the U.S. Marines arrived in American Samoa. The construction of quarters at Utulei was incomplete, as was Camp Samuel Nicholas in Fagaʻalu. Some of the Marines of the 2nd Division were therefore moved into the village of Pavaʻiaʻi. A soldier later wrote about his experience in the village: "We found the Samoan people to be exceptionally clean people... The residents... were gracious and attempted to do everything possible to make the presence of the Marines pleasant."

In July 1974, a village fire destroyed the Haleck's West Building, which included Haleck's Island Motors, Video Samoa, Intercontinental Trading Company, and J & J World Travel. There was a quick replacement of the compound with new facilities in the early 1980s.

In 2005, government employees digging an area in Pavaiai village uncovered the remains of an ancient village 6.4 feet (2 m) below the surface. The senior archeologist for the American Samoa Power Authority, David Addison, told reporters that the artifacts are estimated to be between 1500 and 2000 year-old.

== Demographics ==
| Year | Population |
|---|---|
| 2020 | 2,112 |
| 2010 | 2,450 |
| 2000 | 2,200 |
| 1990 | 1,692 |
| 1980 | 1,031 |
| 1970 | 638 |
| 1960 | 492 |
| 1950 | 342 |
| 1940 | 203 |
| 1930 | 140 |

== Notable people ==
- Faimalo & Leomiti Nofo Tualauta
- Galoia Pulusila Matua
- Paogofie Sasa'e Matua
- Tuanaitau F. Tuia Sa'o
- Vele Kuka Tei
