= Tafuna-Leone Plain =

Coordinates: 14°21′S 170°45′W

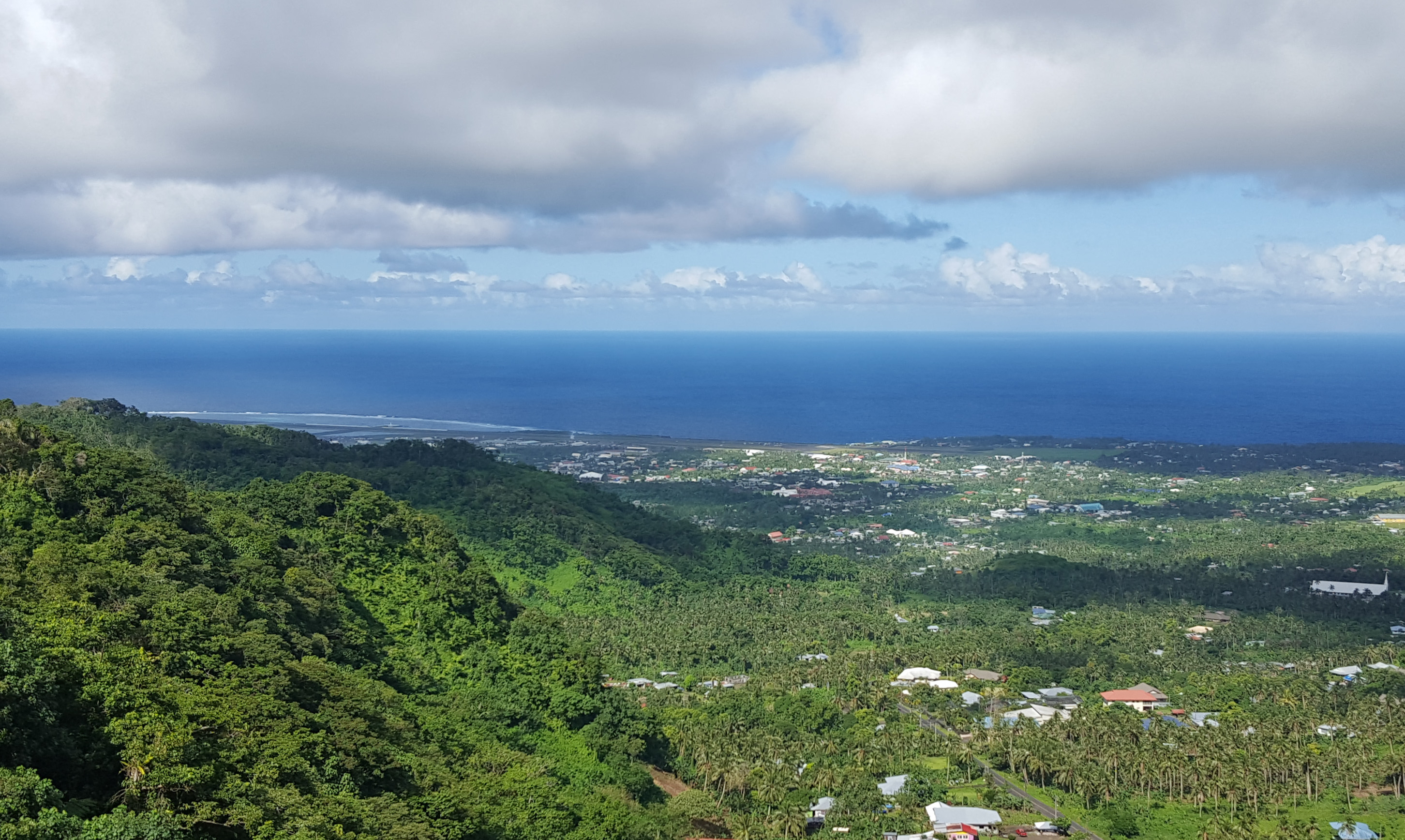
View of the Tāfuna Plain from A'oloau.

The Tafuna-Leone Plain forms the largest contiguous expanse of level, developable land in American Sāmoa. It is the only significant flat land on Tutuila Island. Much of Tutuila Island, especially its mountainous northern region, consists of older volcanic formations characterized by low permeability. In contrast, the Tafuna-Leone Plain in the southwest is composed of more recent volcanic rocks with higher permeability.

Most of the lowland rainforest on the Tafuna-Leone Plain has been cleared, with only a few remaining fragments scattered across the area. Adjacent to the Fatuoaiga Catholic Church Center and the Tia Seu Lupe Historic Monument at Ottoville, a 20-acre reserve protects the island's last remaining lowland rainforest on Tutuila.

It is the largest expanse of level terrain on Tutuila Island, covering approximately 35 square kilometers (13.5 sq. mi.). Formed by extrusive volcanic activity that overlaid an older eroded surface, it contains the island's only extensive aquifer.

== Geography ==
Its terrain includes numerous hills rising more than 183 meters (600 ft.), formed by Holocene volcanic eruptions overlying a preexisting barrier reef. Much of the island's industry and population are concentrated on the plain's relatively flat areas. Pago Pago International Airport occupies a low-lying section in the southeast, where rainfall averages approximately 118 inches per year. Between 1970 and 2004, annual precipitation at the airport varied by as much as 46 inches above average (in 1981) and 61 inches below average during the 1997–98 El Niño event. Urbanization—consisting of low buildings and paved roads—occurs primarily in the eastern portion near the airport.

Located on Tutuila Island's southwestern coast, the Tafuna-Leone Plain exhibits the island's gentlest topography, featuring approximately 200 meters of relief. The landscape formed during the Holocene, when volcanic eruptions buried portions of an older barrier reef.
