= Cathedral of the Holy Family (Tafuna, American Samoa) =

- Cathedral of the Holy Family
- 14°19′51.7″S 170°44′1.68″W
- Location: Tafuna, American Samoa, United States
- Denomination: Roman Catholic

History
- Status: Cathedral

Architecture
- Functional status: Active
- Completed: 1994

Administration
- Diocese: Samoa–Pago Pago

Clergy
- Bishop: Most Rev. Kolio Etuale

The Cathedral of the Holy Family is a late 20th-century church that serves as the Cathedral—together with the Co-Cathedral of St. Joseph the Worker—of the Roman Catholic Diocese of Samoa–Pago Pago in American Samoa, an unincorporated territory of the United States. It is located in the Ottoville district of Tafuna, the largest city in the territory.

== Leadership ==
Rev. John Quinn Weitzel was appointed by Pope John Paul II to serve as the first Catholic bishop of the newly established Roman Catholic Diocese of Samoa–Pago Pago in American Samoa. He was ordained as a bishop of the Catholic Church at Fatuoaiga on October 29, 1986. Bishop Weitzel was a patron of the arts and a strong supporter of local artists, whose work adorns much of the Cathedral of the Holy Family. The current bishop is the Most Rev. Kolio Etuale.

== Architecture ==
The construction of the cathedral began between the late 1980s and early 1990s and it opened in 1995. It is known for its art pieces, which incorporate the Samoan culture.

The exterior architecture of the church is modern, blending Samoan cultural elements with Catholic symbolism. The building is entirely white, with a large dome in the centre, featuring a symmetrical design.

The interior of the church is noted for its mixture of European and local Samoan features in its design. This is demonstrated in the stained glass windows and numerous pieces of art adorning the cathedral. A 1991 painting by Duffy Sheridan features the Holy Family, with a Samoan beach as the setting.

== See also ==
- List of Catholic cathedrals in the United States
- List of cathedrals in the United States
