= Fogamaʻa Crater =

Valley basin in American Samoa

Coordinates: 14.357°S 170.753°W

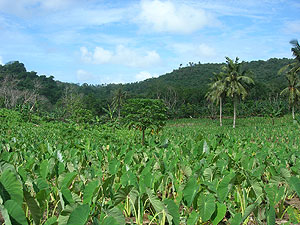
Fogamaʻa Crater National Natural Landmark

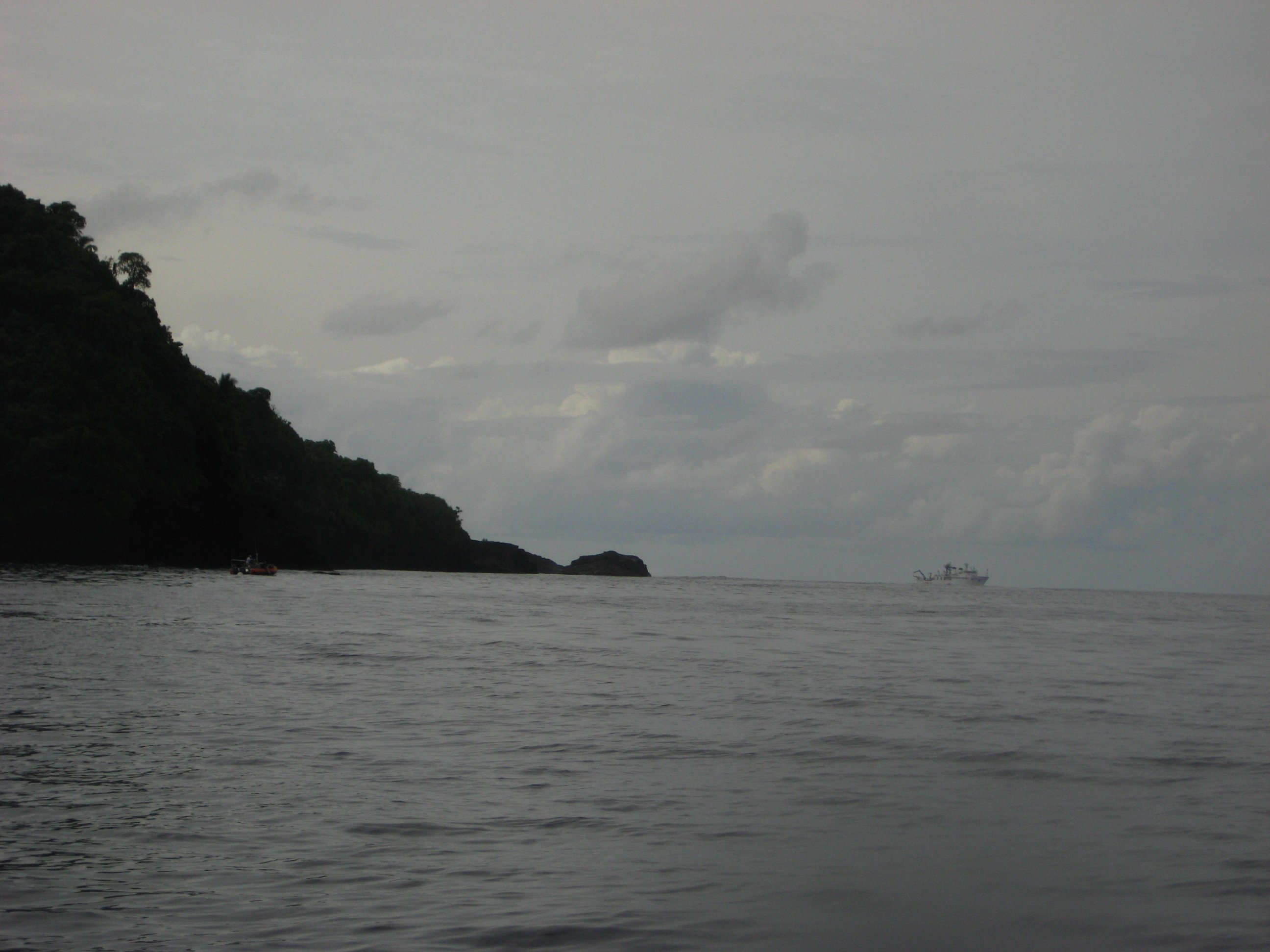
Steps Point, the most southerly point of Samoa (excluding Rose Atoll).

Fogamaʻa Crater (Samoan: Fogāmaʻa) is a valley basin on Tutuila Island, American Samoa, immediately north of Larsen Bay and south of Logotala Hill. It is also known as Hidden Beach or Larsen’s Cove.

It is a prominent crater on the island. The Fogamaʻa Crater National Natural Landmark contains 485 acres (196 ha) and was designated in 1972. It is scenic and geologically significant as the most recent illustration of volcanism in American Samoa. It is one of very few places where illustrations of the most recent episode of American Samoa volcanism can be seen.

The crater is situated immediately inland from Larsen Bay, which contains two smaller coves: Fagalua and Fogamaʻa. Fogamaʻa Cove is an idyllic and isolated beach on the inner margin of Larsen's Bay. There are extensive seabird breeding grounds in Larsen's Bay.

Fogamaʻa Crater National Natural Landmark is located next to Fagatele Bay and also includes Steps Point, the southernmost point of the island.

== History ==
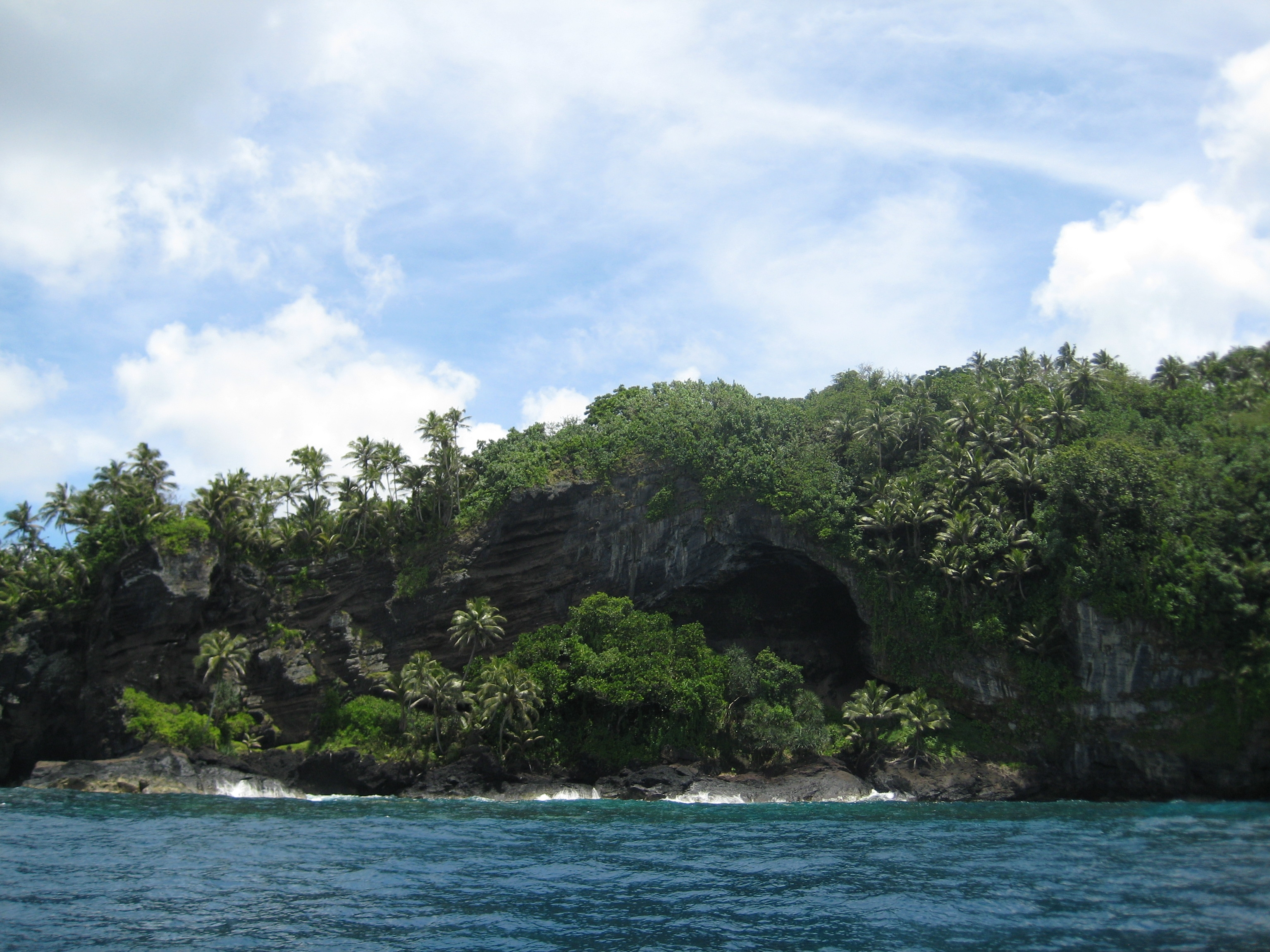
A large cave in the lava formation at Larsen's Bay.

The nearby village of Vaitogi was previously located in the Fogamaʻa Crater, where the villagers had rich soil for farming and plenty of game for hunting. However, families began leaving the area at the end of the 19th century due to ease in connecting with other villages. The present-day location of the village was much closer to other villages when traveling on foot. Vaitogians often visit Fogamaʻa to enjoy the beach and bay.

== See also ==
- List of National Natural Landmarks in American Samoa
