= Destiny Vaeao =

American football player (born 1994)

No. 97
- Position: Defensive tackle

Personal information
- Born: January 15, 1994 (age 32); American Samoa
- Listed height: 6 ft 4 in (1.93 m)
- Listed weight: 301 lb (137 kg)

Career information
- High school: Tafuna (American Samoa)
- College: Washington State
- NFL draft: 2016: undrafted

Career history
- Philadelphia Eagles (2016–2018); New York Jets (2018); Carolina Panthers (2019); New Jersey Generals (2022); Vegas Vipers (2023)

Awards and highlights
- Super Bowl champion (LII); Second-team All-Pac-12 (2015)

Career NFL statistics
- Total tackles: 27
- Sacks: 3.0
- Forced fumbles: 1
- Stats at Pro Football Reference

Destiny Lalotoa Vaeao (born January 15, 1994) is a former American football defensive tackle. He was signed by the Philadelphia Eagles as an undrafted free agent in 2016 after playing college football at Washington State.

== Professional career ==
Pre-draft measurables
Height	Weight	Arm length	Hand span	40-yard dash	10-yard split	20-yard split	20-yard shuttle	Three-cone drill	Vertical jump	Broad jump	Bench press
6 ft 3 7/8 in (1.93 m)	295 lb (134 kg)	32 1/2 in (0.83 m)	10 in (0.25 m)	5.21 s	1.77 s	2.95 s	4.56 s	7.73 s	35.5 in (0.90 m)	9 ft 0 in (2.74 m)	27 reps
All values from Pro Day

=== Philadelphia Eagles ===
Vaeao was signed by the Philadelphia Eagles as an undrafted free agent on May 5, 2016. He made the Eagles final roster, playing in all 16 games recording 15 tackles, two sacks and a forced fumble. Vaeao recorded 10 tackles in his second season and won Super Bowl LII 41–33 against the New England Patriots.

On October 16, 2018, Vaeao was waived/injured by the Eagles and was placed on injured reserve. He was released on October 24, 2018.

=== New York Jets ===
On November 19, 2018, Vaeao was signed to the New York Jets practice squad. He was promoted to the active roster on December 29, 2018.

=== Carolina Panthers ===
On April 8, 2019, Vaeao signed with the Carolina Panthers. He was placed on injured reserve on August 28, 2019. He was waived from injured reserve on September 24.

=== New Jersey Generals ===
Vaeao was drafted by the New Jersey Generals of the United States Football League in the 24th round of the 2022 USFL draft. He was transferred to the team's inactive roster on April 22, 2022, due to a quadriceps injury. He was moved back to the active roster on May 6.

=== Vegas Vipers ===
The Vegas Vipers selected Vaeao in the second round of the 2023 XFL Supplemental Draft on January 1, 2023. He was activated from the team's reserve list on April 14, 2023. He was removed from the roster after the 2023 season.
