= Tia Seu Lupe =

American Samoa historical site

Tia Seu Lupe is a historical site at Fatuoaiga, American Samoa, which is maintained by the American Samoa Department of Parks and Recreation. The Tia Seu Lupe Historic Monument was dedicated by Governor Peter Tali Coleman in May 1990. It is located on a 0.2 ha plot of land on the Tafuna Plain which has been leased by the Government of American Samoa. The monument exhibits a stone structure which archeologists believe were platforms constructed for the chiefly sport of pigeon catching. The name "Tia Seu Lupe" literally means "earthen mound to catch pigeons".

Tia Seu Lupe is located near the Holy Family Catholic Cathedral at Ottoville, in a historical park adjacent to the Fatuoaiga Catholic Church Center. The restored pigeon-catching mound resembles in many ways that of the later marae of Eastern Polynesia. It is the most accessible of American Samoa’s star mounds. Tia Seu Lupe has a viewing platform where visitors can observe the two distinct tiers of the ancient structure. It is located behind a statue of St. Mary near the Catholic cathedral at Fatuoaiga.

The historical park is located next to the only patch of lowland rainforest still found on Tutuila Island.
