= Kolio Etuale =

Samoan priest (born 1973)

His Excellency, The Most Reverend Kolio Tumanuvao Etuale
- Bishop of Samoa–Pago Pago
- Diocese: Samoa–Pago Pago
- Appointed: August 4, 2022
- Installed: April 29, 2023
- Predecessor: Peter Brown

Orders
- Ordination: March 29, 2003 by John Quinn Weitzel
- Consecration: November 4, 2022 by Peter Brown, Alapati Lui Mataeliga, and Novatus Rugambwa

Personal details
- Born: Kolio Etuale; March 17, 1973 (age 53) Lotofaga, Samoa
- Education: Fa'asao Marist High School
- Motto: O le alofa e fai taulaga (Love is sacrifice)
- Coat of arms: Kolio Tumanuvao Etuale's coat of arms

Styles of Kolio Etuale
- Reference style: His Excellency; The Most Reverend
- Spoken style: Your Excellency
- Religious style: Bishop

Kolio Tumanuvao Etuale (born March 17, 1973) is a Samoan prelate of the Catholic Church who serves as the third bishop for the Diocese of Samoa–Pago Pago since 2023. He is the first Samoan appointed Bishop of American Samoa.

== Biography ==
Kolio Etuale was born in Lotofaga, Samoa, on March 17, 1973, and was educated by the Marist Brothers and Mount Angel Seminary. On March 29, 2003, Etuale was ordained to the priesthood by Bishop John Quinn Weitzel for the Diocese of Samoa-Pago Pago. He served as the chaplain for St. Theresa Elementary School and was chancellor for the Diocese of Samoa-Pago Pago before being elevated to Bishop.

Pope Francis appointed Etuale as coadjutor bishop for the Diocese of Samoa–Pago Pago on August 4, 2022. On November 4, 2022, Etuale was consecrated by Bishop Peter Hugh Brown. On April 29, 2023, Pope Francis accepted the resignation of Bishop Brown and Etuale succeeded him as bishop.

== See also ==
- Catholic Church hierarchy
- Catholic Church in the United States
- Historical list of the Catholic bishops of the United States
- List of Catholic bishops of the United States
- Lists of patriarchs, archbishops, and bishops

== Episcopal succession ==
Catholic Church titles
| Preceded by Peter Brown | Bishop of Samoa–Pago Pago; 2023-Present | Succeeded by Incumbent |
| Preceded by - | Coadjutor Bishop of Samoa–Pago Pago; 2022-2023 | Succeeded by - |
