= Vaitogi, American Samoa =

Vaitogi
- Village
- Etymology: Samoan: "water thrown"
- Location within American Samoa
- Coordinates: 14°21′S 170°44′W
- Country: United States
- Territory: American Samoa
- County: Tuālāuta

Area
  - Total: 1.25 sq mi (03.25 km^{2})

Population (2020)
  - Total: 1,921
  - Density: 1,530/sq mi (591/km^{2})
- Demonym: Vaitogian
- Time zone: Samoa Time Zone
- ZIP code: 96799
- Area code: +1 684

Vaitogi is a village in American Samoa. It has many missionaries and tourists who are attracted by shopping for local products. Vaitogi might be most famous of its legends about the Turtle and Shark (Laumei ma Malie). It is said that once, at a time when food was scarce, an old woman took her granddaughter to the bluff at Vaitogi, and holding hands, they leaped into the sea down below. While the young girl was transformed into a shark, the blind grandmother became a turtle. It gives its name to a local U-shaped cove in town, which was listed on the U.S. National Register of Historic Places in 2014.

Fogāma'a Crater Trail is a 3-mile (4.8 km) roundtrip hiking trail in Vaitogi. The trail goes by two scenic beaches before ending at the junction with the Fagatele Bay National Marine Sanctuary Trail. Fogāma'a Crater is a National Natural Landmark.

It is home to Tessarea Vaitogi Inn, which is a hotel in town.

== Etymology ==
Although there is no specific account of the name’s origin, the name may be related to the lack of water in the area, according to oral tradition. The name Vaitogi translates to “water thrown”.

== History ==
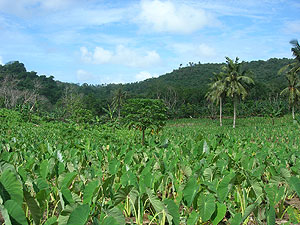
Fogama'a Crater National Natural Landmark

Vaitogi was first located in the Fogāma'a Crater, located on the southwestern coast of the present-day village. It had rich soil for farming and plenty of game for hunting nearby, however, families began moving away from Fogāma'a before the end of the 19th century to the present-day location due to convenience and ease in connecting with other villages. The present location is much closer if traveled by foot. Evidence of early village settlement can still be found in Fogāma'a and Vaitogians often visit Fogāma'a to enjoy the bay and beach.

Vaitogi was visited by Robert J. Maxwell in 1965-1966, who sampled 52 participants in a 22-month research project inspired by the theories of Hans Eysenck concerning Extraversion and introversion behavior.

Vaitogi villagers gather once every year to commemorate an incident that happened over a century ago. At one point, a fire raged through the village for days and could not be extinguished, threatening lives and destroying scores of hectares of vegetation and crops. After the village chiefs gathered to pray for the fires to end, heavy rain supposedly fell extinguishing the flames. The village observes a 24-hour curfew once per year to mark the event.

Toeupu of Vaitogi became the first person to be convicted and hanged for murder in American Samoa. Toeupu was executed on July 1, 1921, for killing Sake of Leone over a gambling debt. Toeupu armed himself with a shotgun and sought out Sake of Leone, whom he fired upon and killed. He was arrested and brought to trial eleven days later. He confessed his guilt and was sentenced to be hanged. California lawyer C.S. Hannum found the execution of a self-confessed killer, only 26 days after the commission of the crime, to be intolerable. He complained to President Calvin Coolidge about the "illegal hanging of a Samoan."

During World War II, a radio station comprising a main radio building, a generator facility, and several smaller structures was established in Vaitogi, southwest of the Tafuna Airbase. Nearby, three buildings served as living quarters.

Between 2022 and 2024, a new park was established in Vaitogi, featuring a 27-hole miniature putt-putt golf course, eight Samoan fales, and a wading pool. The park was funded by a $1.2 million grant from the Land and Water Conservation Fund, administered by the U.S. National Park Service.

=== Margaret Mead ===
Year	Population
2020	1,921
2010	1,959
2000	1,347
1990	1,302
1980	664
1970	473
1960	409
1950	421
1940	235
1930	217

Archaeologist Margaret Mead stayed in Pago Pago for six weeks when she studied the Samoan language. She later spent ten days in Vaitogi as the guest of the local chief in town. The chief and villagers treated her like royalty, and provided her with a bed made of twenty woven mats topped with a blanket and sheets. The villagers also gave her information and access to elders in distant villages. She was on the island of Tutuila for a total of two months. Vaitogi was Mead's favorite Samoan village, and she wrote to a friend: “Here they love me and I love them”.

She also described her stay: “It was there [in Vaitogi] I had all my essential training in how to manage Samoan etiquette… I learned to eat and enjoy Samoan food and to feel unabashed when, as a guest, I was served first and the whole family sat about sedately waiting for me to finish so that they, in turn, could eat… Day by day I grew easier in the language, sat more correctly… I learned how to relate to other people in terms of their rank and how to reply in terms of the rank they accorded me."

== Geography ==
Vaitogi is located on the southern tip of Tutuila Island. On clear days, the island of Aunu'u in the east can be seen from the shores in town. It is 12 miles (19 km) southwest of Pago Pago. Vaitogi’s coastline is made up of rugged cliffs and molten lava rocks, with a few patches of sand. There is no reef except at the secluded Fogāma'a Beach situated at Fogāma'a Crater, which is listed as a National Marine Sanctuary.

== Economy ==
Vaitogians have been traditionally known to be skilled farmers, and the large flatlands toward inland Vaitogi were a great advantage for the farmers. Vaitogi is also notable for its past sugar cane fields. The sugar cane leaves were woven into thatches for the roofs of fales (houses). The Vaitogi farmers also planted palm trees to cater to the demands of roof thatching. The products were often sold at the Fagatogo Market. Agriculture was a vital source of income particularly after families began settling further inland. Crops such as cucumber, head cabbage, pineapple, and lime are still brought from Vaitogi to be sold at the Fagatogo Market.

== Demographics ==
Vaitogi was home to 1,347 residents at the 2000 U.S. census, where 35.1% of residents were foreign-born. 53 percent were male and 47 percent female. The majority were under the age of fifty. According to the 2010 U.S. Census, the village was home to 1,959, a large increase since the year 2000. The village is also home people from Western Samoa, Fiji, Tonga, Korea, China, and Tokelau.

== Religion ==
Vaitogi worshipped in private homes and guest houses of the village chiefs until the church was built in the 1850s. The first Christian denomination to be established in the village was the Congregational Christian Church in American Samoa. Other denominations in Vaitogi are the Seventh-day Adventists, Tongan Methodists, Baháʼí, and the Assembly of God.

== Sports ==
The village’s traditional symbol and icon is Pisisami (sea breeze). The icon is often used in athletic activities and private business. In professional sports, the men’s cricket team has won the islandwide championship title several years, and the women’s cricket team has won the championship in the women’s division.

== Landmarks ==
- Fogāma'a Crater National Natural Landmark
- Turtle and Shark
- Larsen Bay

== Notable people ==
- Tofilau Eti Alesana, prime minister of Samoa, the longest serving head of a state in the Pacific Ocean.
- Gaea Pelefoti Failautusi (1939–2023), former American Samoan Senator
- Mike Iupati, American football guard for the Seattle Seahawks of the NFL.
- Sau Ueligiton, artist, lived in Vaitogi for 25 years.
