= Peter Brown (bishop) =

New Zealand-born prelate (born 1947)

His Excellency, The Most Reverend Peter Hugh Brown C.Ss.R.
- Bishop Emeritus of Samoa-Pago Pago
- Diocese: Samoa-Pago Pago
- Appointed: May 31, 2013
- Installed: August 22, 2013
- Retired: April 29, 2023
- Predecessor: John Quinn Weitzel, M.M.
- Successor: Kolio Etuale
- Previous post: Redemptorist Regional Superior

Orders
- Ordination: December 19, 1981 by Brian Ashby
- Consecration: August 22, 2013 by Martin Krebs, John Quinn Weitzel, and Denis Browne

Personal details
- Born: November 8, 1947 (age 78) Greymouth, New Zealand
- Denomination: Roman Catholic
- Education: University of Divinity
- Motto: Ua na'o le atua e faafou mea uma lava (Only God makes all things new)

Styles of Peter Hugh Brown
- Reference style: His Excellency; The Most Reverend
- Spoken style: Your Excellency
- Religious style: Bishop

Peter Hugh Brown, C.Ss.R. (born 8 November 1947) is a New Zealand-born prelate who served as the second bishop of the Diocese of Samoa-Pago Pago in American Samoa from 2013 until 2023.

== Biography ==
=== Early life ===
Peter Brown was born on November 8, 1947, in Greymouth, New Zealand, the youngest child of William and Mary (Sweeney) Brown. He attended Marist Brothers primary and secondary schools, then worked in secular jobs. On February 16, 1969, Brown professed his first vows as a member of the Congregation of the Most Holy Redeemer. After several years in seminary, he professed his perpetual vows to the Redemptorists on October 26, 1975.

For seven years Brown worked as a religious brother in different communities, then traveled to Samoa to help out at the Redemptorist mission there. He then studied for the priesthood at Yarra Theological Union in Melbourne, Australia.

=== Priesthood ===
Brown was ordained to the priesthood for the Redemptorists by Bishop Brian Ashby on December 19, 1981. He served as a missionary on Savaii Island, Safotu, then later as a chaplain for migrants in Auckland, New Zealand. Brown served as a parish priest in Clover Park, South Auckland, before being elected as the Redemptorist's regional superior. Brown is fluent in the Samoan language.

=== Bishop of Samoa-Pago Pago ===
Pope Francis named Brown the bishop of the Diocese of Samoa-Pago Pago on May 31, 2013. On August 22, 2013, Brown was installed and consecrated by Archbishop Martin Krebs. The principal co-consecrators were Bishops John Weitzel and Denis Browne. On April 29, 2023, Francis accepted his resignation and Kolio Etuale succeeded him as bishop.

== See also ==
- Catholic Church hierarchy
- Catholic Church in the United States
- Historical list of the Catholic bishops of the United States
- List of Catholic bishops of the United States
- Lists of patriarchs, archbishops, and bishops

Catholic Church titles
| Preceded by John Quinn Weitzel | Bishop of Samoa-Pago Pago; 2013–2023 | Succeeded by Kolio Etuale |
