= Turtle and Shark =

Historic place in American Samoa

- U.S. National Register of Historic Places
- Location within American Samoa
- Nearest city: Vaitogi, American Samoa
- Coordinates: 14°21′26″S 170°44′8″W
- Area: 2.3 acres (0.93 ha)
- NRHP reference No.: 14000925
- Added to NRHP: November 19, 2014

Turtle and Shark (Laumei ma Malie in Samoan) is a place with association to an important legend in the culture of Samoa. It is located on the southern shore of Tutuila, the largest island of American Samoa, a short way south of the village of Vaitogi. The feature known as Turtle and Shark is a U-shaped cove, set between Vaitogi Beach to the north and a basalt cliff to the south. The cove is about 72 metres (236 ft) measured from east to west and 78.5 metres (258 ft) measured from north to south. The topography of the cove is such that it is frequently subjected to high-energy wave action, with spray thrown high into the air. The cove is believed by the Samoan populace to be the location of the climactic scene of the Turtle and Shark legend, one of the island's best-known and popular tales.

The earliest documented form of the Turtle and Shark legend was published in 1884 by a missionary:

A story is told of a woman and her child, who in a time of great scarcity were neglected by the family. One day they cooked some wild yams, but never offered her a share. She was vexed, asked the child to follow her, and when they reached a precipice on the rocky coast, seized the child and jumped over. It is said they were changed into turtles, and afterwards came in that form at the call of the people of the village.

By the early 20th century, the tale had been altered to involve a ritual for avoiding famine, and had become strongly attached to the cove at Vaitogi. The village was described by anthropologist Margaret Mead as the site of the "famous" legend.

The site was listed on the National Register of Historic Places in 2014.

== See also ==
- National Register of Historic Places listings in American Samoa
