= Fiafia =

Social occasion in Tokelau

In Tokelau a fiafia (literally "celebration," "get-together," or "happy") is a ritualized public social occasion, that comprises an exchange between two or more "sides" of various kinds of "gifts", which need not be material, including skits, theatrical performances, food, money, speeches, and even clowning; but mainly dancing. Fiafia are held at the conclusions of sporting contests, in particular the Tokelauan communal cricket matches, and meetings, on saints days, and during Christmastide; and one common form of such dance is the fatele.

Such celebrations also happen in Samoa, and although the tradition form can still be seen on formal ceremonial occasions (weddings, inaugurations of schools and churches, awards) a more common form nowadays is a less formal "fiafia night" which is usually a buffet meal with slap-dancing and fire-dancing.

The name was used as the name of the merged tribe name in the 2016 season of Australian Survivor.
