= John Quinn Weitzel =

American Samoan Roman Catholic bishop (1928–2022)

The Most Reverend John Quinn Weitzel M.M.
- Bishop Emeritus of Samoa-Pago Pago
- Diocese: Samoa-Pago Pago
- Appointed: June 9, 1986
- Installed: October 29, 1986
- Term ended: May 31, 2013
- Predecessor: First bishop
- Successor: Peter Brown

Orders
- Ordination: June 11, 1955 by Raymond Aloysius Lane
- Consecration: October 29, 1986 by: Pio Taofinu'u; Joseph Anthony Ferrario; Patrick Vincent Hurley

Personal details
- Born: May 10, 1928 Chicago, Illinois, U.S.
- Died: December 30, 2022 (aged 94) Maryknoll, New York, U.S.

Styles of John Quinn Weitzel
- Reference style: His Excellency; The Most Reverend
- Spoken style: Your Excellency
- Religious style: Bishop

John Quinn Weitzel M.M. (May 10, 1928 – December 30, 2022) was an American prelate of the Roman Catholic Church who served as bishop of the Diocese of Samoa-Pago Pago in American Samoa.

== Biography ==
=== Early life ===
Weitzel was born in Chicago, Illinois, on May 10, 1928. Weitzel attended St. Francis Xavier School in LaGrange and St. Luke School in River Forest during his early education. During his secondary years, he went to Fenwick High School, but transferred during his junior year to attend Archbishop Quigley Preparatory Seminary, a preparatory school for those considering priesthood. He then studied at Maryknoll Venard Apostolic College and Maryknoll Seminary, graduating with a bachelor's in philosophy and a master's in religious education from the latter.

He was ordained a Catholic priest for the Catholic Foreign Mission Society of America on June 11, 1955. Afterwards, he was assigned to promotional and fundraising work in the Chicago area, before returning to New York in 1967 to work as Maryknoll Assistant Director of Development. He was granted an overseas mission in Falealupo in Western Samoa in 1978.

=== Bishop of Samoa-Pago Pago ===
Pope John Paul II appointed Weitzel as the first bishop of the newly-erected diocese of Samoa-Pago Pago on June 9, 1986. He was consecrated on October 29, 1986 by Pio Taofinu'u, with Joseph Ferrario and Patrick Vincent Hurley as co-consecrators.

Weitzel's letter of resignation as bishop of Samoa-Pago Pago was accepted by Pope Francis on Friday, May 31, 2013.

=== Death ===
Weitzel died on December 30, 2022, following a short illness.

== See also ==
- Catholic Church hierarchy
- Catholic Church in the United States
- Historical list of the Catholic bishops of the United States
- List of Catholic bishops of the United States
- Lists of patriarchs, archbishops, and bishops

Catholic Church titles
Preceded by First Bishop	Bishop of Samoa–Pago Pago; 1986–2013	Succeeded by Peter Brown
