= Tradewinds Hotel =

Hotel in Ottoville, American Samoa

Coordinates: 14.33539°S 170.73043°W

General information
- Location: Ottoville

Other information
- Number of rooms: 104
- Number of suites: 51
- Number of restaurants: 1

Tradewinds Hotel is a luxury hotel in Ottoville, American Samoa. The hotel has 104 guest rooms, 43 suites and 8 large suites. is served by the Equator restaurant which uses inspiration from local Samoan cooking for American, European, Pacific and Asian cuisine.

The hotel hosted the Miss Island Queen Pageant in 2009.
