= Veterans Memorial Stadium (Pago Pago) =

Sports venue in American Samoa

Coordinates: 14°20′1″S 170°43′20″W

- Tafuna Stadium
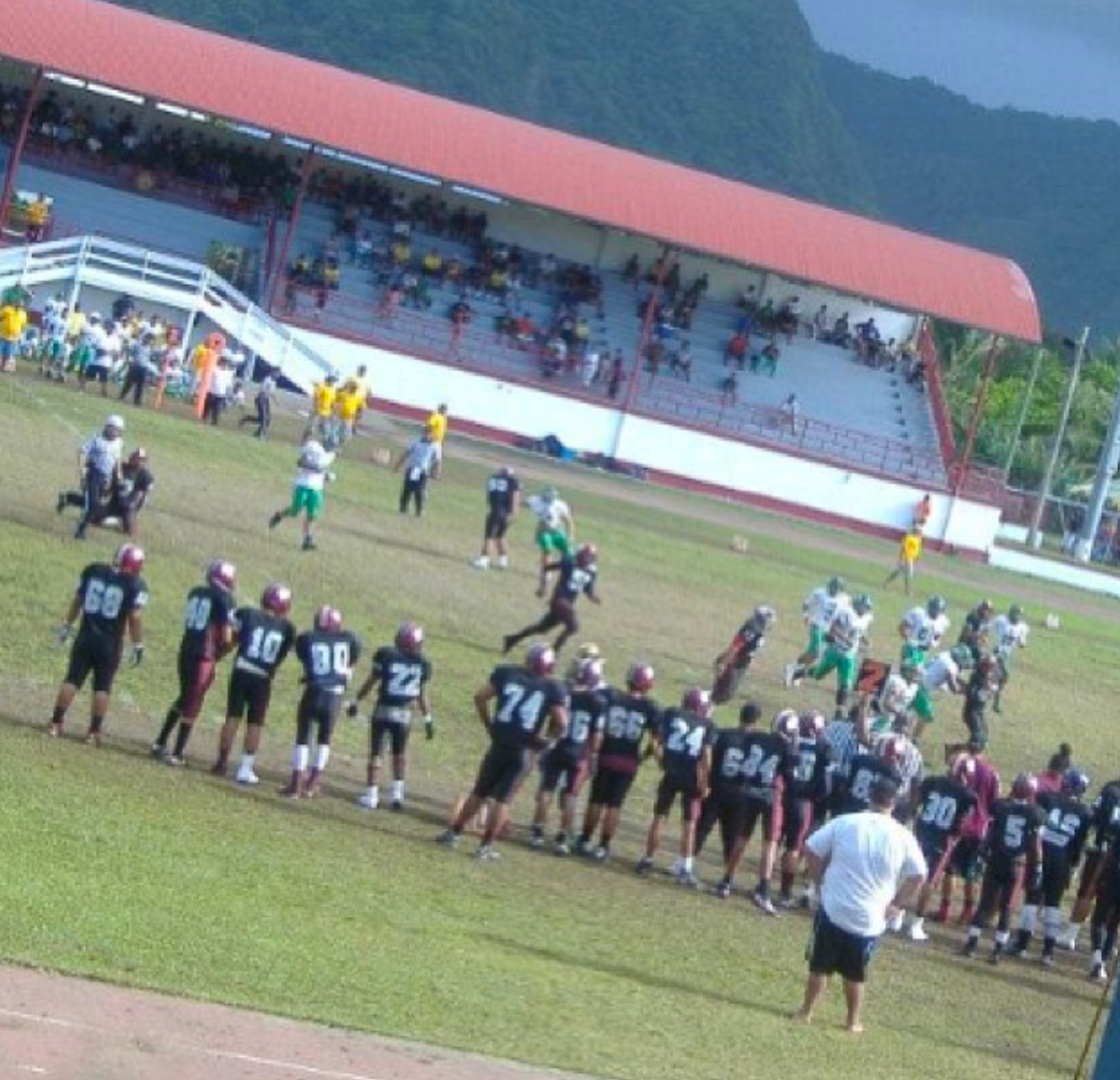
- Interactive map of Veterans Memorial Stadium
- Location: Pago Pago, American Samoa
- Capacity: 5,000 (football), with standing places
- Surface: Grass

Construction
- Built: 1996-97
- Opened: 1997

The Veterans Memorial Stadium is a sports stadium located in Tafuna, American Samoa. The 5,000-capacity venue is one of the smallest stadiums in Oceania, and serves as American Samoa's national stadium. It is currently used mostly for matches in various football codes, such as soccer, rugby league, and the territory's most popular code, American football. The grass field of which Veterans Memorial Stadium is built on is known as the Malae o Lupelele (Ili’ili village’s traditional gathering ground). Every year, the territory’s annual flag day celebrations are held at the stadium.
