= KVZK-TV =

Public television station in Pago Pago, American Samoa

- Pago Pago; American Samoa
- Channels: Digital: 5 (VHF); Virtual: 2, 5, 7, and 8

Programming
- Affiliations: PBS, ABC, CBS, NBC

Ownership
- Owner: Office of Public Information (Government of American Samoa)

History
- First air date: October 5, 1964
- Call sign meaning: Randomly assigned

Technical information
- Licensing authority: Government of American Samoa
- Transmitter coordinates: 14°15′54.5″S 170°41′14.5″W

Links
- Website: kvzktv.com

KVZK-TV is the public government-owned broadcaster of the U.S. territory of American Samoa, based in Pago Pago. A subsidiary of the Office of Public Information, currently directed by Aaron Hall, it was established in 1964. KVZK-TV broadcasts from the National Register–listed Michael J. Kirwan Educational Television Center in Utulei and maintains a tower on Mount Alava.

The operations of KVZK-TV are not licensed by the Federal Communications Commission (FCC), though other stations on the island are; KVZK-TV nonetheless complies with FCC rules and regulations. The station also received grants from the now-defunct Corporation for Public Broadcasting (CPB); in 2017–18, the Office of Public Information had a budget of $1.9 million, with $638,000 coming from a CPB grant.

== Services ==
KVZK-TV operates a series of television channels that provide local interest and United States network programming. NBC, ABC and CBS provide their programs to KVZK free of charge, and the feeds are received by way of local cable provider Bluesky, which carries all four.

- Channel 2, the primary service, carries all local origination programming, including local news.
- Channel 5 (previously 4) airs NBC programming from KHNL in Honolulu, Hawaii.
- Channel 7 airs PBS programming.
- Channel 8 airs CBS programming from KGMB in Honolulu.

Previously broadcast as separate analog channels, KVZK-TV converted to digital in the late 2000s. In 2010, it received $300,000 in funding from the American Recovery and Reinvestment Act of 2009 to convert the transmitter serving the Manuʻa Islands.

== History ==
=== The educational years ===
Teachers supposedly teaching in English were incapable of making themselves understood to me. I could not help but wonder what the youngsters were learning.

— H. Rex Lee on the education system in American Samoa when he arrived

In 1961, H. Rex Lee arrived to take the position of Governor of American Samoa. The educational system on the island, he found, was in utter disarray, with poor rates of graduation and a staff of teachers that demonstrated poor mastery of English. Lee, inspired by projects in cities such as Washington, D.C., New York City, and Philadelphia, sought to develop an educational television system; he received $3,538,000, to develop a three-channel system. Alongside educational television came major changes in education, with the construction of 22 consolidated elementary schools and a new power plant, as well as the electrification of many villages; whereas the entire island's generating capacity was 2,100 kilowatts in 1961, this was increased to 6,000 by 1965. Due to the unsuitability of road construction and helicopter access, the Mount Alava transmitter site was initially accessed by a mile-long aerial tramway over Pago Pago Harbor, which cost $140,000 and was later opened as a tourist attraction. Much of this investment was secured by Lee's connection to congressman Michael J. Kirwan, who had long taken an interest in American development efforts in the Pacific.

KVZK-TV began broadcasting on October 5, 1964, as the first television service in American Samoa and the first educational broadcaster in the South Pacific. The station was a massive effort with a staff of 500 producing programming from four different studios to air over six separate channels. Teachers were initially recruited from the mainland, a difficult and expensive task; the use of television allowed schools to utilize their experience and reduced the number of teachers that needed to be imported, all without displacing some 300 Samoan teachers, some of whom had been employed for 35 to 40 years. One of the facilities in the studio center was a library to assist in preparing lessons.

Particular emphasis was made on teaching English orally; reading and writing in Samoan were confined to the first and second grades. Some classes were not about school subjects: one teacher from the mainland's first job was to present the hygiene and sanitation class, which taught students how to shower and use toilet paper. In addition to school classes, teacher training and adult education programs were broadcast; this marked the first time that teacher in-service programs were implemented in American Samoa. There were also plans to broadcast news.

KVZK-TV attracted immediate interest as one of the world's largest experiments in educational television, attracting attention in the press and scholarly articles and frequent visits by education ministers, public officials, and broadcasters around the world—including President Lyndon B. Johnson, who spoke at the KVZK-TV studios in October 1966. The first phase of three channels was augmented by a second tranche of funding in 1965, to bring high school classes into the system.

As the system evolved, changes were made, though they were slow to come. Lee's replacement, Owen Aspinall, and the National Association of Educational Broadcasters had a falling out, hurting the recruitment of mainland teachers into the program. By the start of the 1970s, there was an increased emphasis on involving Samoans in the operation of the educational television system, and educational television was being deemphasized in the high schools. Aspinall's successor, John Morse Haydon, stated that ETV was not a "total solution" and signed a deal to have consultants from the University of Hawaii evaluate the ETV system.

In 1971, the KVZK educational television system reached its peak in output: seven hours a day of output on six channels, five days a week, comprising most instruction in the elementary schools and some at the high school level, with a technical staff of 110.

=== Shift to commercial operation ===
Slowly, in part due to political turnover and a $10 million budget deficit for the island in 1975, the educational uses were phased out, first in high schools and then in the elementary schools; some criticized what they saw as the overly extensive use of educational television in schools, and new policies emphasized the role of the teacher in classroom instruction. As a result, in 1975, KVZK-TV was separated from the Department of Education into its own agency, the Office of Television Operations; station staff were not consulted about the change. Eventually, KVZK-TV shrunk from six channels to five, then to three—channels 2, 4 and 5—in 1977. Between 1974 and 1978, the station's budget was cut by 61 percent.

At the same time as the educational television system waned, the KVZK-TV operation shifted to emphasize the broadcast of United States network programming and commercial shows, and local production of non-educational programming also increased. By 1974, it was airing shows from all major networks, with an emphasis on NBC. That network's programs were taped in San Francisco and sent to American Samoa on a one-week delay. As this happened, staff from the mainland were slowly replaced with Samoans. In 1974, it sent its first employees to mainland broadcasting schools; at the same time, Samoans were sent to WLUK-TV in Green Bay, Wisconsin, to train on color camera equipment. Jon A. Anderson, who left in 1977 to take a job with Pacific Telestations on Guam, described the station's output that year as "a combination of American commercial and public television programming equal to that available in most communities in the United States". In 1980, American Samoa voters could watch their ballots be counted live at the studios, one at a time; by that same year, however, television's role had been vastly reduced, and many classroom sets were inoperable.

Plans were also considered in 1976 to gift one of the surplus high-band VHF transmitters—not capable of color—to Samoa to start what would be the first television station there.

By 1993, KVZK-TV operated channel 2, which aired PBS programming and news from CNN; channel 4, airing NBC programs; and channel 5, which had aired CBS and ABC programs recorded from the Hawaii stations prior to its tower being damaged in a 1991 hurricane. Channel 2 was also the channel on which all local programs aired—at the time, some 8 1/2 hours a week, including bilingual newscasts in English and Samoan, as well as special presentations. The aerial tramway system had also been in disrepair for "several years" by 1997.

=== Digitalization and possible reorganization ===
After having aired on KKHJ-LP from 2005 to 2012, NBC returned to KVZK in 2014, utilizing a direct feed of KHNL-TV provided by the American Samoa Telecommunications Authority (ASTCA). Simultaneous with the return of NBC, the 30-minute newscast, Talafou, was extended to an hour, allowing for half-hour segments in Samoan and English.

In 2019, Representative Gafatasi Afalava criticized the station and its director, Tuimavave Tauapai Laupola, for the station's poor technical quality and its switch from recording church services in the villages to doing so at its studios; Tuimavave noted that the station did not have the funds to hire a qualified engineer despite having advertised the position in both Samoas and the United States. Vice speaker Fetu Fetui, Jr., noted that stations in the country of Samoa were more advanced than KVZK-TV. In 2020, KVZK-TV cut its longstanding ties with CNN, saying that the $700,000 a year the station paid to CNN was not worth it for the programming they received.

A merger of KVZK-TV with the ASTCA has also been considered.

== Local programming ==
In addition to its local newscasts, KVZK-TV produces and airs local non-news programming. KVZK-TV also airs Sauniga Lotu, presentations of Sunday evening church services from various villages.

In 2019, for just the second time in its history, KVZK-TV presented live programming from Samoa when it carried daily coverage of the 2019 Pacific Games.

== Historic studio building ==
KVZK-TV operates from the purpose-built Michael J. Kirwan Educational Television Center—dedicated for the congressman when the station opened in 1964. Fifty years later, the building was still nearly original, except for a roof replacement. Restoration work took place on the first floor in 2015, including gutting the interior and restoring the exterior to its original appearance; however, the second floor was then sealed off due to a rat infestation.
