= Leone High School =

High school in American Samoa, United States

Coordinates: 14°20′57.19″S 170°46′47.64″W

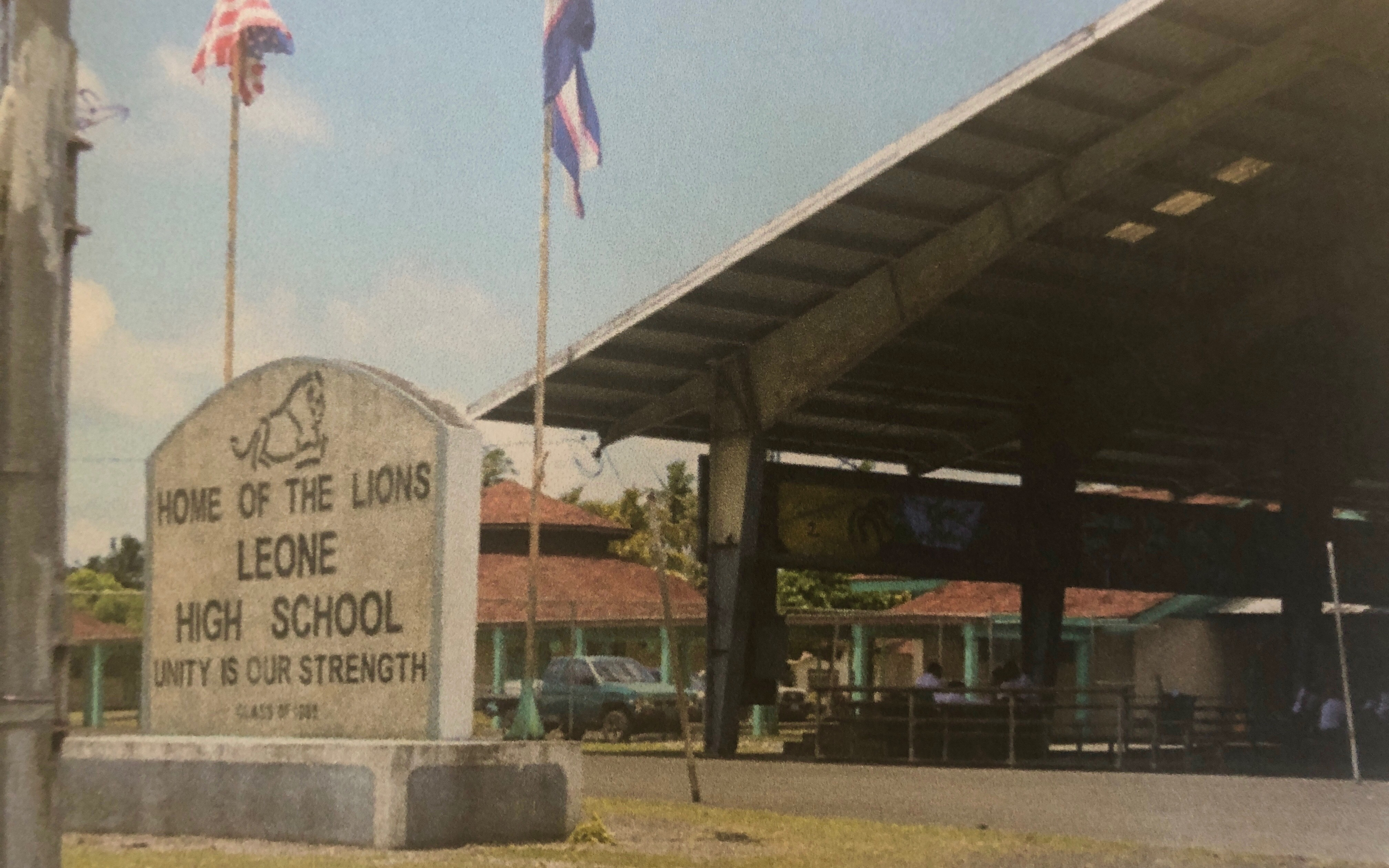

Leone High School is a senior high school in Vailoatai and Leone, in the Western District, American Samoa. It is operated by the American Samoa Department of Education. It is the second-largest high school on Tutuila Island.

It was opened in September 1965. It was designed for students from the Western District and transfer students from Manua. Central island and Eastern District students attended the High School of American Samoa at Utulei, later to be known as Samoana High School.

Leone High School was the second structure in American Samoa to receive an honor for its design. The same architects, Wimberly, Whisenand, Allison, and Tong of Hawai'i, received their first award for the Governor H. Rex Lee Auditorium. They have also designed Rainmaker Hotel and Pacific Coconut Processing (now part of StarKist).

== Notable alumni ==
- Malaetasi Togāfau: First Valedictorian, Former Fono Representative (Itū’au District) & Former Judge (Class Of 1966)
- Savali Talavou Ale: Fono Representative (Alātaua District) Longest & Current Speaker Of The House (Class Of 1971)
- Fagaoatua Dorian Salāve’a: Former Educator & Principal of Leone High School & Former Fono Representative (Fofō District) (Class of 1993)
- Shalimar Seiuli: Former Beauty Queen— Miss SOFIAS 1993 & Entertainer (Class Of 1994)
- Gabe Reid: Former NFL Player (Class Of 1995)
- Jaiyah Saelua: International Football Player (Soccer) & the First transgender player to compete in a FIFA World Cup Qualifiers (Class Of 2006)
- Fa'alili Fa'amoe: College football offensive tackle (Class of 2020)
