= Governor H. Rex Lee Auditorium =

- U.S. National Register of Historic Places
- Location within American Samoa
- Location: American Samoa Highway 001, Utulei, American Samoa
- Coordinates: 14°16′44″S 170°40′59″W
- Area: Less than 1 acre (0.40 ha)
- Built: 1962
- NRHP reference No.: 10000888
- Added to NRHP: November 12, 2010

The Governor H. Rex Lee Auditorium, also called Fale Laumei ("Turtle House") in Samoan, is the largest indoor meeting space in the United States territory of American Samoa. It is located in the village of Utulei, surrounded by other government buildings. The main body of the building is a roughly ovoid structure, with a curved roof (finished with wooden shakes) that is reminiscent of the thatch roofs of traditional Samoan structures. The auditorium was built in 1962 under orders from Governor Hyrum Rex Lee as part of a major initiative to modernize the territory's infrastructure and facilities. It was built by a construction squadron of the United States Navy, and was completed in time for the 1962 South Pacific Conference. It was later named in honor of Lee, who was the territory's longest-serving governor, and oversaw much of its modernization.

The building was added to the National Register of Historic Places in 2010. It was built to house the delegates of the 1962 South Pacific Conference. The structure would later be known as Fale Laumei (Turtle House).

In 2017, the Fono building in Fagatogo was demolished and the House of Representatives began utilizing the auditorium's North Wing — which faces KVZK-TV and the main Education Department building — for legislative meetings.

== Design ==
The civic auditorium was constructed in 1962. Governor H. Rex Lee decided the territory needed an auditorium for the 1962 South Pacific Conference which would show American resolve to its only South Pacific territory. Lee ordered the building to be solid, of Samoan motif, and with the ability to house a thousand people. Nationally recognized architect George J. Wimberly of Hawai’i was chosen to do the design. The architectural firm has also designed Hawaiian buildings such as the Waikikian Hotel, the International Market Place, King Hilton on the Big Island, Coco Palms Resort on Kauai, and others. The building was renamed Lee Auditorium by a general memorandum signed by Governor Owen Aspinall on July 1, 1963.

Wimberly, Whisenand, Allison and Tong of Honolulu received an Honor Award from the American Institute of Architects, Hawai’i Chapter, in 1965, for the design. It was the first award-winning structure in the South Pacific Ocean. The same architects also designed the Rainmaker Hotel, government housing (now the Department of Social Services), and Pacific Coconut Processing (now part of StarKist). They also designed Leone High School, from which they received their second award for a building in American Samoa.

== See also ==
- National Register of Historic Places listings in American Samoa
