= Rosevonne Pato =

American Samoan academic administrator

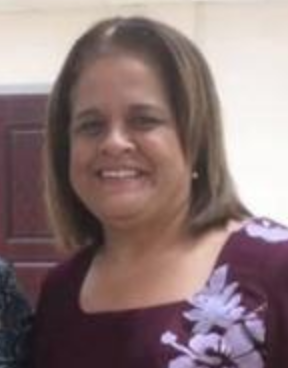
- Pato in 2024

President of American Samoa Community College
- Incumbent
- Assumed office January 2017
- Preceded by: Seth Galea'i

Personal details
- Children: 5
- Education: University of San Francisco (BA); University of Hawaii, Manoa (MEd); Argosy University (EdD)

Rosevonne Makaiwi Pato is an American Samoan academic administrator who has served as the president of the American Samoa Community College (ASCC) since 2017.

== Early career and education ==
Pato's career in education began in 1989. Over the course of her career, she has worked in the American Samoa K-12 system, the Commonwealth of the Northern Mariana Islands Public School System, and the American Samoa government's Social Services Department.

She joined the American Samoa Community College (ASCC) in 2001. Her early roles at the college included serving as an Academic Counselor in the Student Services Department, an instructor for the Health and Human Services Program and the Teacher Education/American Samoa Bachelor's in Education Program, and as an adjunct instructor for the Social Sciences Department. She also served as the chairperson of the Health and Human Services Department.

Pato holds a B.A. in psychology from the University of San Francisco, a M.Ed. in counseling and guidance from the University of Hawaiʻi at Mānoa, and a D.Ed. in counseling psychology from Argosy University, Phoenix.

== Later career ==
Pato held several administrative positions at ASCC, including Director of the Office of Institutional Effectiveness, Vice President of Administrative Services, and Vice President of Academic and Student Affairs. In December 2016, the ASCC Board of Higher Education announced its selection of Pato as the new president of the college. Her official installation as president occurred at the ASCC General Assembly in January 2017.

As president, Pato has overseen significant developments at the college. In January 2018, ASCC officially opened its new Multipurpose Center, a project that had been envisioned since 2004. During the dedication ceremony, Pato acknowledged the contributions of past college president Adele Satele Moali’itele Galea’i, government officials, and partners who helped bring the multi-million dollar project to fruition.

In 2020, Pato reported on the allocation of $1.61 million in federal CARES Act funding received by ASCC due to the COVID-19 pandemic in American Samoa. In December 2024, Pato's leadership was recognized when ASCC received a federal grant of $282,335 from the U.S. Department of Agriculture. This grant was awarded to replace equipment and furniture in several college departments that were damaged during flooding in July 2022.

In March 2025, Pato was present for the establishment of the American Samoa Community College chapter of the Order of the Sword & Shield, a national security honor society. In her remarks at the induction ceremony, she noted that the ASCC chapter was the only one in the Pacific and the only one at a community college in the nation. That same month, Pato was named a recipient of the Shirley B. Gordon Award of Distinction from the Phi Theta Kappa. This award is the most prestigious honor for community college presidents by PTK and recognizes leaders who have shown strong support for student success and the development of student leaders.

Pato began serving as a commissioner for the Accrediting Commission for Community and Junior Colleges (ACCJC) in 2023. She has been a member of the Pacific Postsecondary Education Council since 2013 and has participated in peer review teams for the ACCJC.

== Personal life ==
Pato has five children.
