= American Samoa Community College =

Land-grant community college in Mapusaga, American Samoa

- Motto: Saili le Atamai; Seek the Knowledge/To Seek Knowledge
- Type: Public land-grant community college
- Established: 1970
- Endowment: Territory supported, grant from U.S. Economic Development Administration
- President: Rosevonne Pato
- Faculty: 42
- Administrative staff: 109
- Students: 1,537 undergraduates
- Location: Mapusaga (near Pago Pago), American Samoa; 14.3217°S 170.7422°W
- Campus: 39 acres (16 ha) – 53 acres (21 ha)
- Colors
- Nickname: Chiefs
- Website: amsamoa.edu

- Location within American Samoa

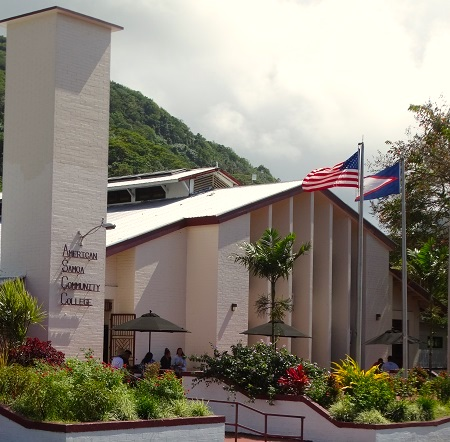
American Samoa Community College

American Samoa Community College (ASCC) is a public land-grant community college in the village of Mapusaga, American Samoa. Only legal residents of American Samoa who have graduated from high school or obtained a General Equivalency Diploma are admitted to ASCC.

It is American Samoa's only tertiary education institution. The main Mapusaga campus has a variety of associate degree programs. Also associated with the college are a nursing school at LBJ Hospital and vocational facilities in the Tafuna Industrial Complex.

ASCC awarded 139 degrees and certificates in 2016, including 75 Associate of Arts degrees, 60 Associate of Science degrees, 3 Certificate of Proficiency, and one Bachelor in Elementary Education. In 2016, the college had 1,254 enrolled full-time students and 553 enrolled part-time. Around 27% majored in liberal arts but other popular majors were business management, accounting, criminal justice, education, nursing, and health science.

== History ==
American Samoa Community College was established in 1970. It started its first year with 474 attending school in Utulei at the old navy buildings that once were the High School of American Samoa (now Samoana High School). Enrollment increased to 550 in the fall of 1971 and 872 by the spring of 1972. The college originally offered an associate degree and transfer to baccalaureate-granting colleges. It offered vocational, teacher, adult education and manpower training. Nurse training was added in 1976. The college was granted one-year accreditation in 1973 and received entitlement to funds under the Higher Education Act of 1963. When the Church of Jesus Christ of Latter-day Saints closed its Mapusaga High School in 1974, the government of American Samoa purchased the buildings for $1.5 million (equivalent to $7,608,000 in 2025), signed a 50-year lease for the 20-acre (8.1 ha) property, and moved the college here. The college received accreditation from the Commission of Junior Colleges, Western Association of Schools and Colleges in 1976. The college's new wing was constructed in 1978 at a cost of $3.5 million (equivalent to $13,540,000 in 2025). ASCC received a $1.5 million federal grant in 1978 (equivalent to $5,803,000 in 2025) in order to establish a Teacher Corps project to improve the teaching quality.

The college was established in 1970 as part of the American Samoa Department of Education to provide residents the opportunity to enjoy postsecondary education in the liberal arts, teacher training, vocational-technical education, and general education. The first freshman class had only 131 students. The school moved into a few buildings on the island before moving permanently to its current location in Mapusaga in 1974. To aid the college's move to Mapusagafou, Tauese Sunia served as the Vice President, supporting the President in the relocation process.

In 1979, Sa'euteuga Le'au Scanlan became the first Samoan female college president. She had previously been assigned to the core group which organized the college and became vice president in 1978 and the college's third president in January 1979. During her tenure, the staff increased from 20 to over 70. She successfully lobbied for the college to be accredited by the Western Association of Schools and Colleges (WASC) and for land-grant status.

In 1979, the U.S. Economic Development Administration provided a grant that allowed the college to add five modern buildings for the fine arts, nursing, science, and vocational training. ASCC was also able to add a cafeteria and a gymnasium. A new library was added in 2003. New administrative offices, lecture hall and two new teacher education classrooms were added in 2008. The computer and science labs were renovated and upgraded with funding from the American Reinvestment and Recovery Act in 2011. Groundbreaking for the Multi-Purpose Center was initiated in 2013.

In November 1985, the Health Care Center at ASCC opened. The college also began a program to enable local nurses to take national tests as registered and licensed practical nurses.

In 2000, Tauiliili Pemerika Tauiliili was appointed to the board of regents by Governor Tauese Sunia. He had been a teacher at the college and the head of the Land Grant division. The college's Land Grant building is named after him.

Samoan artist Sven Ortquist has been an artist-in-residence at the college.

== Academics ==
ASCC offers Associate of Arts and Associate of Science degrees, as well as certificate programs. It is accredited by the Accrediting Commission for Community and Junior Colleges.

== Student body ==
93 percent of students are residents of American Samoa; however, only 24 percent have Samoan citizenship. Roughly 23 percent are over the age of 26. Around 75 percent of enrolled students are full-time students, while first-year students make up 47 percent of the total student body.

== Notable alumni ==
- Lemanu Peleti Mauga, Governor of American Samoa
- Lutu T. S. Fuimaono, the longest-serving member of the American Samoa Senate
- Saul Goodman

== Notable faculty ==
- Mike Gabbard
- Salu Hunkin-Finau, former president of American Samoa Community College
- Sa'eu Scanlan, the college's first Samoan president
- Galeai Moaaliitele Tuufuli

== See also ==
- List of universities in Polynesia
