= Rex Lee =

Rex Lee may refer to:

- Rex Lee (actor) (born 1969), American actor
- Rex E. Lee (1935–1996), US Solicitor General under President Reagan and later president of Brigham Young University
- H. Rex Lee (1910–2001), two-time Governor of American Samoa and FCC commissioner
