= Attorney General Aspinall =

Attorney General Aspinall may refer to:

- Butler Cole Aspinall (1830–1875), Attorney General of Victoria
- Owen Aspinall (1927–1997), Attorney General of American Samoa
