= Isaac Sopoaga =

American Samoan gridiron football player (born 1981)

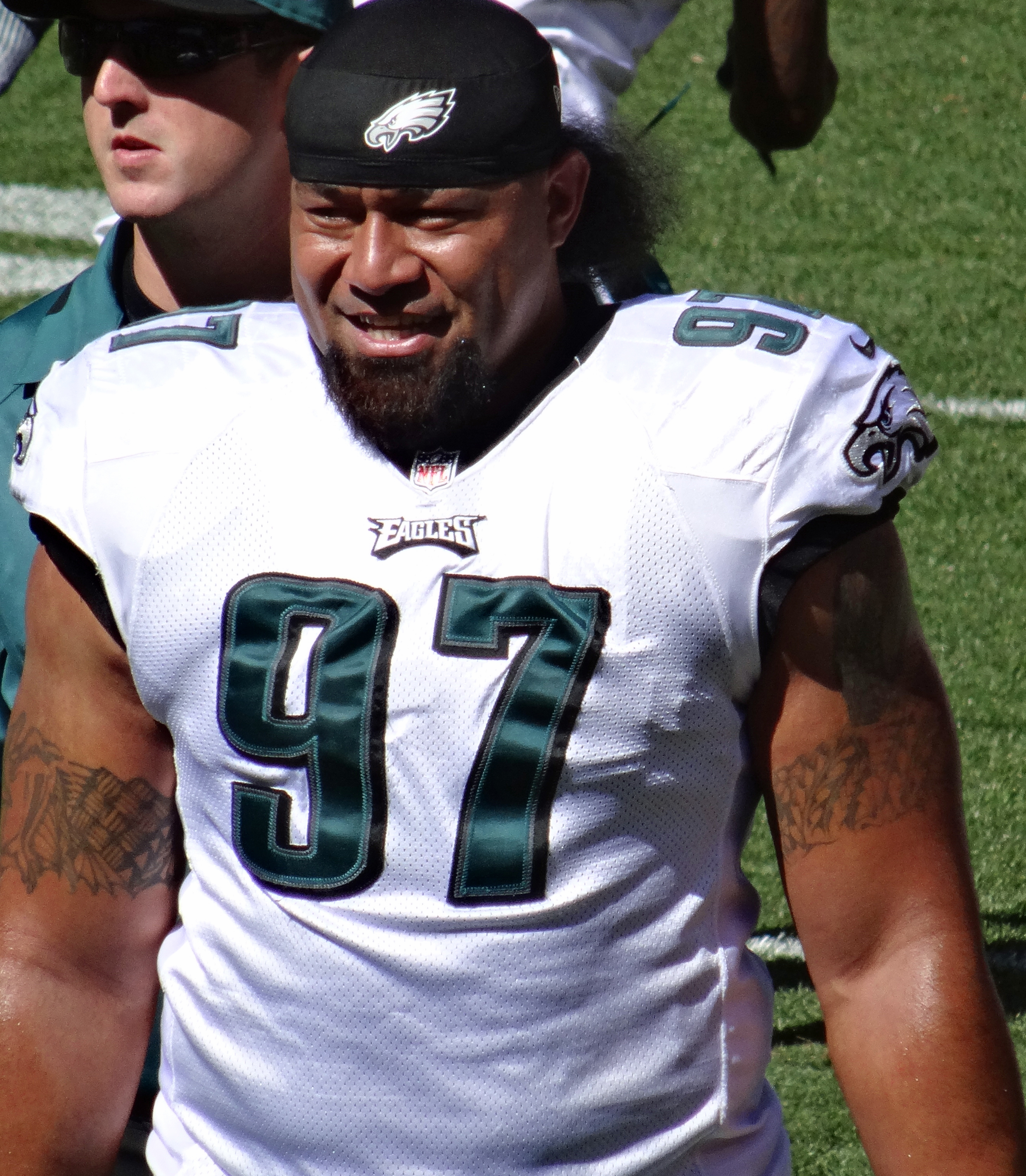
- Sopoaga with the Philadelphia Eagles in 2013

No. 90, 97
- Position: Nose tackle

Personal information
- Born: September 4, 1981 (age 45); Pago Pago, American Samoa
- Listed height: 6 ft 2 in (1.88 m)
- Listed weight: 330 lb (150 kg)

Career information
- High school: Samoana (Utulei, American Samoa)
- College: Hawaii
- NFL draft: 2004: 4th round, 104th overall pick

Career history
- San Francisco 49ers (2004–2012); Philadelphia Eagles (2013); New England Patriots (2013); Arizona Cardinals (2014)*
- * Offseason or practice squad member only

Awards and highlights
- Second-team All-WAC (2002)

Career NFL statistics
- Total tackles: 235
- Sacks: 8.5
- Forced fumbles: 1
- Fumble recoveries: 2
- Stats at Pro Football Reference

Isa'ako "Isaac" Sopoaga (pronounced /soʊpoʊˈɑːɡə/ soh-poh-AH-gə; born September 4, 1981) is a former American football nose tackle. He was selected by the San Francisco 49ers in the fourth round of the 2004 NFL draft. He played college football at Hawaii.

== Early life ==
Sopoaga attended Samoana High School in Pago Pago, Eastern School District, American Samoa and was a letterman in football, basketball, and baseball. In football, he was a two-time All-League selection and as a senior, he was named the League's Defensive Player of the Year. He played rugby growing up in Samoa. Isaac also attributes his strong throwing arm, reportedly being able to throw the ball 78 yards flat footed, to throwing 1–2 pound rocks at coconuts up to 70 feet high hanging from the trees. He would eventually develop enough strength and accuracy to knock down five or six coconuts in a matter of five minutes according to his own account.

== College career ==
Sopoaga began his collegiate career at the College of the Canyons. As a freshman, he was suspended for two games after hitting an opposing player. In his sophomore season in 2000, he recorded 31 sacks, which still stands as the single-season record in California community college football. He then decided to sit out the 2001 season to establish residency. Sopoaga was inducted into the College of the Canyons Athletic Hall of Fame in 2011.

He then attended the University of Hawaii, where he started his junior and senior years, and collected 128 tackles (70 solos) with four sacks for minus 28 yards, 15 stops for losses of 56 yards, eleven quarterback pressures, a pair of fumble recoveries, two forced fumbles and three pass deflections in 25 games with the Warriors.

== Professional career ==
=== Pre-draft ===
Projected to be an early second round selection, Sopoaga was ranked as the No. 4 defensive tackle available in the 2004 NFL draft by Sports Illustrated and the No. 9 defensive tackle available by NFLDraftScout. As of 2018, Sopoaga is one of only seventeen prospects to repeat more than 40 lifts at the 225-pound (102 kg) bench press at the NFL Scouting Combine since 1999. While he was noted for his "outstanding strength" and quickness off the snap, scouts criticized his tendency to "get tall, which negates his power," as well as his lack of hand technique. Sopoaga was eventually selected in the fourth round, 104th overall, by the San Francisco 49ers. He was the highest selected Hawaii Warriors defensive lineman since Al Noga in 1988.

Pre-draft measurables
Height	Weight	Arm length	Hand span	40-yard dash	10-yard split	20-yard split	20-yard shuttle	Three-cone drill	Vertical jump	Broad jump	Bench press
6 ft 2 1/4 in (1.89 m)	317 lb (144 kg)	33 1/2 in (0.85 m)	11 in (0.28 m)	5.05 s	1.80 s	2.94 s	4.66 s	7.79 s	30.5 in (0.77 m)	8 ft 3 in (2.51 m)	42 reps
All values from NFL Combine

=== San Francisco 49ers ===
Sopoaga was selected by the San Francisco 49ers in the fourth round (104 overall) in the 2004 NFL draft. Sopoaga missed the entire 2004 season with an injury. In 2008, the 49ers stated that they would use Sopoaga as a defensive end. For the 2010 season, Sopoaga started at left defensive end in the 49ers 3-4 defense.

In the October 17, 2010 game against the Oakland Raiders, Sopoaga lined up as a fullback and successfully blocked for Frank Gore deep in the red zone near the end of the game. The play resulted in a first down which allowed the 49ers who were leading 17 to 9 to run out the clock and win the game. In a Monday press conference following the game 49ers head coach Mike Singletary said that putting Sopoaga in as fullback was an idea he presented to former offensive coordinator Jimmy Raye earlier in 2010. Singletary gave credit to Bill Walsh's playing of guard Guy McIntyre as a fullback rather than Mike Ditka's playing of lineman William "The Fridge" Perry as a fullback on Singletary's Chicago Bears team, since Walsh started the trend and Ditka followed. Prior to the 2011 season the 49ers parted ways with nose tackle Aubrayo Franklin, leaving a void at the nose tackle position which was filled by Sopoaga. On October 30, 2011, playing from fullback position, Sopoaga caught a pass for a key first down in the fourth quarter of the 49ers' 20–10 victory over the Cleveland Browns.

At the end of the 2012 season, Sopoaga and the 49ers appeared in Super Bowl XLVII. In the game, he had four combined tackles as the 49ers fell to the Baltimore Ravens by a score of 34–31.

=== Philadelphia Eagles ===
Sopoaga signed a three-year, $12 million deal with the Philadelphia Eagles on March 12, 2013.

=== New England Patriots ===
On October 29, 2013, Sopoaga was traded to the New England Patriots along with a sixth-round pick for a fifth-round draft pick in the 2014 draft.

=== Arizona Cardinals ===
Soon after working out for the Arizona Cardinals on August 20, 2014, Sopoaga officially signed with them. The Cardinals released Sopoaga on August 30, 2014.

== NFL career statistics ==
Legend
**Bold**	Career high

=== Regular season ===
Year	Team	Games		Tackles					Interceptions					Fumbles			
Year	Team	GP	GS	Cmb	Solo	Ast	Sck	TFL	Int	Yds	TD	Lng	PD	FF	FR	Yds	TD
2005	SFO	**16**	1	22	16	6	0.0	3	0	0	0	0	1	0	0	0	0
2006	SFO	15	2	22	17	5	**1.5**	3	0	0	0	0	**3**	**1**	**1**	0	0
2007	SFO	**16**	5	27	14	13	**1.5**	3	0	0	0	0	1	0	0	0	0
2008	SFO	**16**	15	**40**	**26**	**14**	1.0	**4**	0	0	0	0	1	0	0	0	0
2009	SFO	**16**	**16**	29	19	10	1.0	1	0	0	0	0	1	0	0	0	0
2010	SFO	**16**	**16**	25	17	8	**1.5**	2	0	0	0	0	1	0	0	0	0
2011	SFO	15	15	31	20	11	0.0	1	0	0	0	0	1	0	**1**	0	0
2012	SFO	15	9	27	21	6	1.0	3	0	0	0	0	0	0	0	0	0
2013	PHI	8	7	10	7	3	0.0	1	0	0	0	0	0	0	0	0	0
2013	NE	6	2	2	1	1	1.0	1	0	0	0	0	1	0	0	0	0
		139	88	235	158	77	8.5	22	0	0	0	0	10	1	2	0	0

=== Playoffs ===
Year	Team	Games		Tackles					Interceptions					Fumbles			
Year	Team	GP	GS	Cmb	Solo	Ast	Sck	TFL	Int	Yds	TD	Lng	PD	FF	FR	Yds	TD
2011	SFO	2	**2**	3	3	0	0.0	0	0	0	0	0	0	0	0	0	0
2012	SFO	**3**	1	**7**	**6**	**1**	**1.0**	0	0	0	0	0	0	0	0	0	0
		5	3	10	9	1	1.0	0	0	0	0	0	0	0	0	0	0

== Personal life ==
A native of American Samoa, Sopoaga was raised in the village of Fagasa, an isolated fishing community. He is one of nine children (four brothers, four sisters) of Suitupe and Lagiselota Sopoaga.

He owns a second home in Hawaii, where he spends the off-season.

Sopoaga's nephew, Penei Sewell, won the Outland and Morris trophies playing college football for the Oregon Ducks and is an All-Pro and 2× Pro Bowl offensive tackle taken 7th overall by the Detroit Lions in the 2021 NFL draft.
