= Governor Barnett =

Governor Barnett may refer to:

- Frank Barnett (1933–2016), Governor of American Samoa from 1976 to 1977
- Ross Barnett (1898–1987), 53rd Governor of Mississippi
