= Feleti Barstow Public Library =

Library

Coordinates: 14°16′51″S 170°41′03″W

Feleti Barstow Public Library is the main library in American Samoa, and is located in the village of Utulei in Maoputasi County. It is the central public library for the territory and is situated immediately across from the Office of Tourism, next to the Executive Office Building, and just behind Samoana High School. Besides a permanent display depicting American Samoa’s involvement in the Apollo Space Program, the library has also worked with the American Samoa Historic Preservation Office (ASHPO) since 2000 at creating a historic Polynesian Photo Archive. The goal of the project has been to electronically catalog and archive around 6,000 still and moving images of Polynesia which were collected by the American Samoa Government. The library has an extensive Pacific Collection which houses articles, books, and reports relevant to Pacific- and Samoan history. A large collection of photographs are stored in its Polynesian Photo Archive, which is a subset of their Pacific Collection.

The library is named after Frederic “Feleti” Duclos Barstow, the first American philanthropist to come to the Samoan Islands. His trust fund, the Frederic Duclos Barstow Foundation, has contributed generously to the library.

== History ==
Governor Clark Daniel Stearns built American Samoa’s first library which he stocked with books that he personally solicited from friends in mainland United States. The library was built in Samoan-style at the later site of the Congressional Church of Jesus in Fagatogo. The library served the public until its stock and functions were merged into the High School of American Samoa in 1950.

The Feleti Barstow Public Library building was constructed with the Department of the Interior appropriations. It also received $60,000 from the Barstow Foundation to buy its opening stock of books. The library opened by the Fagatogo dockside in April 1973.

Hurricane Val caused irreparable damage to the former library in 1991, and as a result of executive order 09-1991, a new public library was set to be developed. Construction on the new library was completed in 1998 and the library officially opened on April 17, 2000, during American Samoa's Centennial Flag Day celebrations. In 2005, the library held over 27,000 items and had 13,000 card members.

An Apollo 11 50th-anniversary exhibit was held at the library in July 2019, in order to mark the milestone of 50 years since the first Moon landing. First Lady Cynthia Malala Moliga was among those present attending the exhibit opening. A gallery was part of the exhibit and included photographs of the airport welcoming for the astronauts and a photo of President Richard Nixon presenting the American Samoa flag and Moon rocks to Governor John Morse Haydon. The exhibition was produced by Feleti Barstow Public Library, Jean P. Haydon Museum, and the Office of Archives.

== See also ==
- List of libraries in the United States
