= Fa'alili Fa'amoe =

American football player (born 2002)

Profile
- Position: Offensive tackle

Personal information
- Born: January 29, 2002 (age 24); Leone, American Samoa
- Listed height: 6 ft 5 in (1.96 m)
- Listed weight: 311 lb (141 kg)

Career information
- High school: Leone
- College: Washington State (2020–2024); Wake Forest (2025)
- NFL draft: 2026: undrafted
- CFL draft: 2026G: 2nd round, 11th overall pick
- Stats at ESPN

Fa'alili Fa'amoe (born January 29, 2002) is an American Samoan college football offensive tackle for the Wake Forest Demon Deacons. He previously played for the Washington State Cougars.

== Early life ==
Fa'amoe is a native of Pago Pago, American Samoa. He attended Leone High School in American Samoa and committed to play college football for the Washington State Cougars.

== College career ==
=== Washington State ===
In his first two collegiate seasons in 2020 and 2021, Fa'amoe played just one game as a defensive lineman in the 2021 season. Heading into the 2022 season, he was converted from a defensive lineman to an offensive tackle. During the 2022 season, Fa'amoe took over the starting right tackle position, starting in the Cougars final seven games. In 2023, he started all 12 games for the Cougars at right tackle. Heading into the 2024 season, Fa'amoe was named to multiple award watchlists including the Outland Trophy and the Lombardi Award.

On December 16, 2024, Fa'amoe announced that he would enter the transfer portal.

=== Wake Forest ===
On January 5, 2025, Fa'amoe announced that he would transfer to Wake Forest.

== Professional career ==
Pre-draft measurables
Height	Weight	Arm length	Hand span	Wingspan	Vertical jump	Broad jump
6 ft 5 3/8 in (1.97 m)	311 lb (141 kg)	33 7/8 in (0.86 m)	10 5/8 in (0.27 m)	6 ft 10 in (2.08 m)	28.5 in (0.72 m)	8 ft 8 in (2.64 m)
All values from NFL Combine

Fa'amoe went undrafted in the 2026 NFL draft but was drafted in the second round (11th overall) by the Toronto Argonauts in the 2026 CFL global draft.
