= Sa'eu Scanlan =

American Samoan educator

Sa'euteuga Le'au Scanlan (born 21 March 1937) is an educator in American Samoa. Beginning in 1979 she served for over a decade as president of American Samoa Community College, the territory's only institution of higher education, becoming the first Samoan to achieve such a position in the region.

== Early life and education ==
Sa'euteuga Le'au Scanlan, known as Sa'eu, was born in 1937 in the American Samoan village of Fagatogo. She was the fourth of twelve children born to her parents Saipele S. Le'au and Suluama Lea'ai.

Scanlan traveled to the U.S. mainland to study at San Francisco State College (now San Francisco State University), where she graduated with a bachelor's degree. After teaching in American Samoa for several years, she left again to obtain a master's degree at the University of Hawaiʻi. This was followed by a Ph.D. from Brigham Young University in 1975.

== Career ==
In 1970, Scanlan helped launch American Samoa Community College, which remains the territory's only tertiary education institution. After obtaining her doctorate, she returned to American Samoa and became a dean at the community college, then the school's vice president in 1978. The following year, she was promoted to president of American Samoa Community College, the third president in the school's history. Not only was she the first Samoan to serve as president of that college, but a 1987 profile also identified her as "the first Samoan to rise to that level in higher education in the Pacific territories." She remained as president throughout a formative period for the community college, until the mid-1990s.

Scanlan also served for a period as president of the American Samoa National Women's Association after its founding in the 1980s.

== Personal life ==
Sa'eu was married to the businessman High Chief Fanene Morris Scanlan, with whom she had two children, from 1961 until his death in 2018.
