= H. Rex Lee =

American politician (1910–2001)

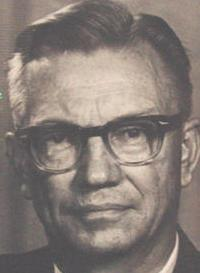

Governor of American Samoa
- In office May 28, 1977 – January 3, 1978
- President: Jimmy Carter
- Preceded by: Frank Barnett
- Succeeded by: Peter Tali Coleman
- In office May 24, 1961 – August 1, 1967
- President: John F. Kennedy; Lyndon B. Johnson
- Preceded by: Peter Tali Coleman
- Succeeded by: Owen Aspinall

Commissioner of the Federal Communications Commission
- In office October 28, 1968 – December 31, 1973
- President: Lyndon B. Johnson; Richard Nixon

Personal details
- Born: Hyrum Rex Lee; April 8, 1910 Rigby, Idaho, U.S.
- Died: July 26, 2001 (aged 91) San Diego, California, U.S.
- Party: Democratic
- Spouse: Lillian "Lily" Lee (October 1, 1912 – 2010)
- Education: University of Idaho
- Awards: President's Award for Distinguished Federal Civilian Service (1966)

Hyrum Rex Lee (April 8, 1910 – July 26, 2001) was an American government employee and diplomat who was the last unelected governor of American Samoa. Lee served as governor from 1961 to 1967, and again briefly from 1977 to 1978. Governor Lee's administration from 1961 to 1967 saw the establishment of schools, a new airport, roads, Rainmaker Hotel, an educational television system, new harbor facilities, and a fisheries cannery. Tourism boomed and there was an increasing acceptance of Western institutions, lifestyles, and ideas. Many residents relocated to California and Hawai'i or joined the U.S. Armed Forces.

Born in Rigby, Idaho, Lee studied agricultural science before working as an economist with the Resettlement Administration. He was then employed by the War Relocation Authority and became assistant chief of the Office of Territories in 1946, until 1950. That year he was appointed as associate (later becoming deputy) commissioner of the Bureau of Indian Affairs, where he was noted for his skills as a congressional liaison. In 1961, he was appointed as Governor of American Samoa as part of the incoming Kennedy administration, serving until 1967.

Lee was seen as a successful administrator by both the Kennedy and Johnson administrations. Following his service in American Samoa, he was appointed to the Federal Communications Commission, where he promoted educational television. He retired in 1973, continuing to promote educational television, but served another term as Governor of American Samoa until the first-ever elected governor assumed office in January 1978.

== Early life and education ==
Lee was born in Rigby on April 8, 1910. His parents had lived in Rigby for their whole lives. He attended the public schools of Jefferson County, Idaho, before studying a bachelor's degree in agricultural science at the University of Idaho, graduating in 1936. In 1964, the university gave him an honorary law degree.

== Early career ==
Lee's entered public service after finishing his degree, and from June 1936 to July 1937, he worked as an economist with the United States Department of Agriculture's Resettlement Administration in Moscow, Idaho. He then joined the University of Idaho Extension Service and served a year as a county assistant agent in Pocatello. From November 1938 to June 1946, he worked in the War Relocation Authority that oversaw the internment of Japanese Americans during World War II. Many Japanese Americans lived on the West Coast at this time. His service included overseeing the Division of Relocation and Evacuee Property. As the internment period began to end in 1945, Lee's job was largely to find temporary housing for Japanese Americans, as many of the soldiers' families had moved to California towards the end of the war, resulting in a lack of available accommodation.

In 1946, Lee transferred to the United States Department of the Interior as assistant chief of the Office of Territories. During his time there, he played a key role in arranging the transfer of American Samoa from Navy to civilian jurisdiction. Lee was a consultant on loan to the United Nations in 1949, and spent three months travelling in the Near East conferring with Arab and Israeli leaders to assist refugees displaced by the Arab–Israeli conflict. Dillon S. Myer, the former director of the War Relocation Authority, had been placed in charge of the Arab Refugee program, and had asked that Lee was assigned to assist him. Lee went on a number of field trips to visit refugee centers in Trans-Jordan, for example in Jericho, Amman, and Jerash.

As Myer was appointed as commissioner of the Department of the Interior's Bureau of Indian Affairs in the spring of 1950, the same day he began work, it was agreed that Lee would move from the Office of Territories to become associate commissioner of the Bureau, replacing William Zimmerman. Lee had worked closely with Congressional committees in his role at the Office of Territories, and so was a valuable asset. The day after Myers' appointment, Lee was able to dissuade Senator Hugh A. Butler of Nebraska from campaigning against his appointment.

Lee was later described as being "better known, probably, than almost anybody else in the Bureau on the Hill, in the Interior Committees, and was rather highly regarded up there by the chairman of the committees". He was also known for having a good working relationship with Wayne N. Aspinall, the chair of the House Committee on Interior and Insular Affairs. In the transition from Dwight D. Eisenhower's administration to John F. Kennedy's administration, Lee was effectively in charge of the Bureau, working with John A. Carver Jr., the Assistant Secretary of the Interior for Public Lands Management. This arrangement lasted for several months until Philleo Nash was confirmed as director of the bureau.

== Governorship and later career ==
=== American Samoa ===
It was Carver who suggested a method of selecting the next Governor of American Samoa that avoided accusations of political bias. A panel of three, including Lee, was chosen. Delma H. Nucker was vetoed as a suggestion for being "too Eisenhower", Hillary A. Tolson, the deputy director of the Park Service, turned it down, and it was only after "much arm twisting" that Lee accepted the role. Lee's first term as governor was from May 24, 1961, to July 31, 1967. Concurrently in 1961, US Air Force Major Eric J. Scanlan, a native Samoan, was appointed as government secretary, a role similar to lieutenant governor. Owen Aspinall, the deputy district attorney of Mesa County, Colorado, and son of Lee's friend Wayne Aspinall, was appointed as Lee's attorney general of American Samoa. By 1963, Aspinall had replaced Scanlan as government secretary, and later succeeded Lee as governor.

Stewart Udall, the United States Secretary of the Interior, said that Lee was appointed as Governor due to his "unique experience and long familiarity in helping to solve" socio-economic problems similar to the ones American Samoa faced. On June 21, 1963, Paramount Chief Tuli Leʻiato of Fagaʻitua was sworn in and installed as the first Secretary of Samoan Affairs by Lee. Under Lee, there were a number of new efforts and programs that took place. He created a cooperative where local Samoans had a share in a new hotel, developed a fishing enterprise that employed local Samoans, increased tourism, by establishing a new airport, harbor facilities, roads and luxury hotels, and also cleaned up the island. Most notably, Lee also launched an educational TV business which was entirely his own conception and execution. Carver described it as "the kind of thing which only Rex Lee could have done".

The program was funded by $15 million that Michael J. Kirwan, the chairman of the Appropriations Committee for Public Works, had authorized. The main television station that was built was named the Michael J. Kirwan Educational Television Center in his honor. George P. Miller, chairman of the House Committee on Science and Astronautics at the time, expressed some concerns with the program. He said that "they had a hard time getting teachers as it is very expensive to bring teachers from the mainland to Samoa, and having them out in the small communities living with the natives was pretty hard for them". He noted, however, that the program "became highly successful".

Lee received the President's Award for Distinguished Federal Civilian Service from Lyndon B. Johnson in 1966 who also credited him with turning American Samoa from a "Pacific Slum" to a "showplace for progress". Udall later said that Lee "turned out to be one of our very best appointments, in my view. He was a bit authoritarian, but I think he did a very good job at Samoa and was really our star performer". He was the last non-elected governor of the territory. He was instrumental in successfully bringing American Samoa's plight to the attention of Congress, and in reforming the infrastructure and educational system.

=== Federal Communications Commission ===
After his term ended in 1967, Lee became the assistant administrator of the US foreign aid program of the United States Department of State. Just over a year later, President Johnson appointed Lee to a seven-year term as a commissioner on the Federal Communications Commission (FCC), which began on October 28, 1968. He served as the commission's education commissioner and was also a member of the Telephone and Telegraph Committee. His main focus was exploiting the full potential of telecommunications to improve the educational system in the United States. He has been characterized as a "quiet member" of the FCC who was "rarely flamboyant or controversial". During his time on the commission, he frequently joined Nicholas Johnson in voting against station purchases in order to avoid media concentration. Alongside Johnson, he was considered on the "liberal wing" of the FCC by The New York Times. He retired 18 months before his term expired on December 31, 1973, from "a desire to retire from career service to try something new." His resignation followed a week after Johnson's.

=== Retirement ===
Lee became a visiting professor at San Diego State University following his retirement from the FCC. In 1975, he became founding chairman of the Public Service Satellite Consortium. In his retirement, he helped to establish educational television in South America. On May 28, 1977, Lee was re-appointed as Governor of American Samoa on an interim basis until the first elected governor, Peter Tali Coleman, assumed office in January 1978.

== Personal life ==
Lee died at his home in La Jolla, San Diego, California, on July 26, 2001, at the age of 91. He had five children (three daughters and two sons). He was a friend of entertainment mogul Walt Disney, who visited the Lee family and stayed at their home. His wife, Lillian Lee, died in April 2010 at the age of 97.

In 1963, William C. Brown Jr. ("Puka Bill") was arrested for threatening to kill Governor Lee and detained for over 48 hours without being informed of the specific charges. Ultimately, the case was dismissed because the government failed to provide due process.

=== Legacy ===
Lee's name is memorialized at the Governor H. Rex Lee Auditorium.

Government offices
Preceded by Peter Tali Coleman	Governor of American Samoa (1st Term); 1961–1967	Succeeded by Owen Stuart Aspinall
Preceded by Frank Barnett	Governor of American Samoa (2nd Term); 1977–1978	Succeeded by Peter Tali Coleman
