= John A. Carver Jr. =

American attorney and politician

Attorney General of American Samoa
- In office 1978–1978
- Governor: H. Rex Lee

Member of the Federal Power Commission
- In office March 2, 1966 - July 31, 1969
- President: Lyndon B. Johnson; Richard Nixon

Under Secretary of the Interior
- In office 1964–1966
- President: Lyndon B. Johnson

Assistant Secretary of the Interior for Public Lands Management
- In office 1961–1964
- President: John F. Kennedy; Lyndon B. Johnson

Assistant Attorney General of Idaho
- In office 1954–1955

Personal details
- Born: April 24, 1918
- Died: November 25, 2016 (aged 98)

John A. Carver Jr. (24 April 1918 – 25 November 2016) was an American attorney and politician.

== Early life and education ==
Carver was born in Preston, Idaho, the son of John A. Carver and LaVerne Olson Carver. Carver attended the public schools of Preston, Pocatello, and Boise, Idaho. He attended Boise Junior College, George Washington University, Brigham Young University (from which he graduated in 1939). He also attended University of Montana Law School, University of Idaho Law School and Georgetown University Law School (from which he graduated in 1947).

== Early career ==
Carver's first job was as a messenger attached to the US Senate Committee to Investigate Railroad Financing, from 1936 to 1937. He joined the War Department in 1941, although he was furloughed for military service in 1943. He served as a First Lieutenant in the United States Air Force, and was discharged in April 1946. Completing his legal studies, he was admitted to practice law in Idaho and the District of Columbia in 1946. From 1947 to 1948, Carver served as Assistant Attorney General of Idaho. From 1948 to 1956, he was a partner in a law firm in Boise, Idaho, called Carver, McClenahan & Greenfield. In 1957, he joined the staff of Senator Frank Church as an administrative assistant, working for him from 1957 to 1960.

== Later career ==
Carver was appointed as Assistant Secretary of the Interior for Public Land Management as part of the incoming John F. Kennedy administration in 1961. He continued in that role until 1964 when he became the Under Secretary of the Interior, only remaining in this role for a year until 1965. He was then nominated by President Johnson to serve as a commissioner on the Federal Power Commission, a role he held from 1966 to 1972. He then left the business of government to become a Professor of Law at the Sturm College of Law, part of the University of Denver. He retired from this in 1988 but continued to teach there as an Emeritus Professor until 2004. Also, he served as special assistant to H. Rex Lee, Governor of American Samoa, from 1977 to 1978, and was Attorney General of American Samoa in 1978.
