= Frank Barnett =

49th Governor of American Samoa

Governor of American Samoa
- In office October 1, 1976 – May 27, 1977
- Preceded by: Earl B. Ruth
- Succeeded by: Hyrum Rex Lee

Personal details
- Born: Frank Elliott Barnett; July 20, 1933 Atlanta, Georgia, U.S.
- Died: July 15, 2016 (aged 82)
- Party: Republican
- Spouse: Carolyn Barnett

Frank Elliott Barnett (July 20, 1933 – July 15, 2016) was the governor of American Samoa from October 1, 1976, to May 27, 1977. Before becoming governor, he was a Federal Bureau of Investigation agent and a Tennessee attorney. He served as the first lieutenant governor of American Samoa for two years prior to his governorship. While Governor, a number of Samoans signed a petition accusing him of abusing local officials; others signed a counter-petition supporting him, and the charges were eventually dropped. This arose from his firing of Mere Betham, a native who had been serving as Samoan Director of Education, an action he defended as necessary to improve education on the island, but others decried as racist; Barnett reinstated Betham one week after dismissing her.

Barnett stepped down early at the request of the United States Department of the Interior, which sought the return of former Governor H. Rex Lee to ensure a smooth transition between Interior-appointed and locally elected governors. Lee was appointed by President John F. Kennedy to modernize American Samoa and eliminate its reputation as “America’s shame in the South Pacific.”

Barnett graduated from Knoxville High School in Knoxville, Tennessee in 1950. He served in the United States Marine Corps. Barnett went to University of Tennessee and later received his law degree in 1959 from University of Tennessee College of Law. He practiced law in Knoxville, Tennessee and was involved with the Republican Party.

Barnett's wife was Carolyn Barnett. They had two children.

Government offices
Preceded by Earl B. Ruth	Governor of American Samoa; 1976–1977	Succeeded by Hyrum Rex Lee
