= Michael J. Kirwan Educational Television Center =

- U.S. National Register of Historic Places
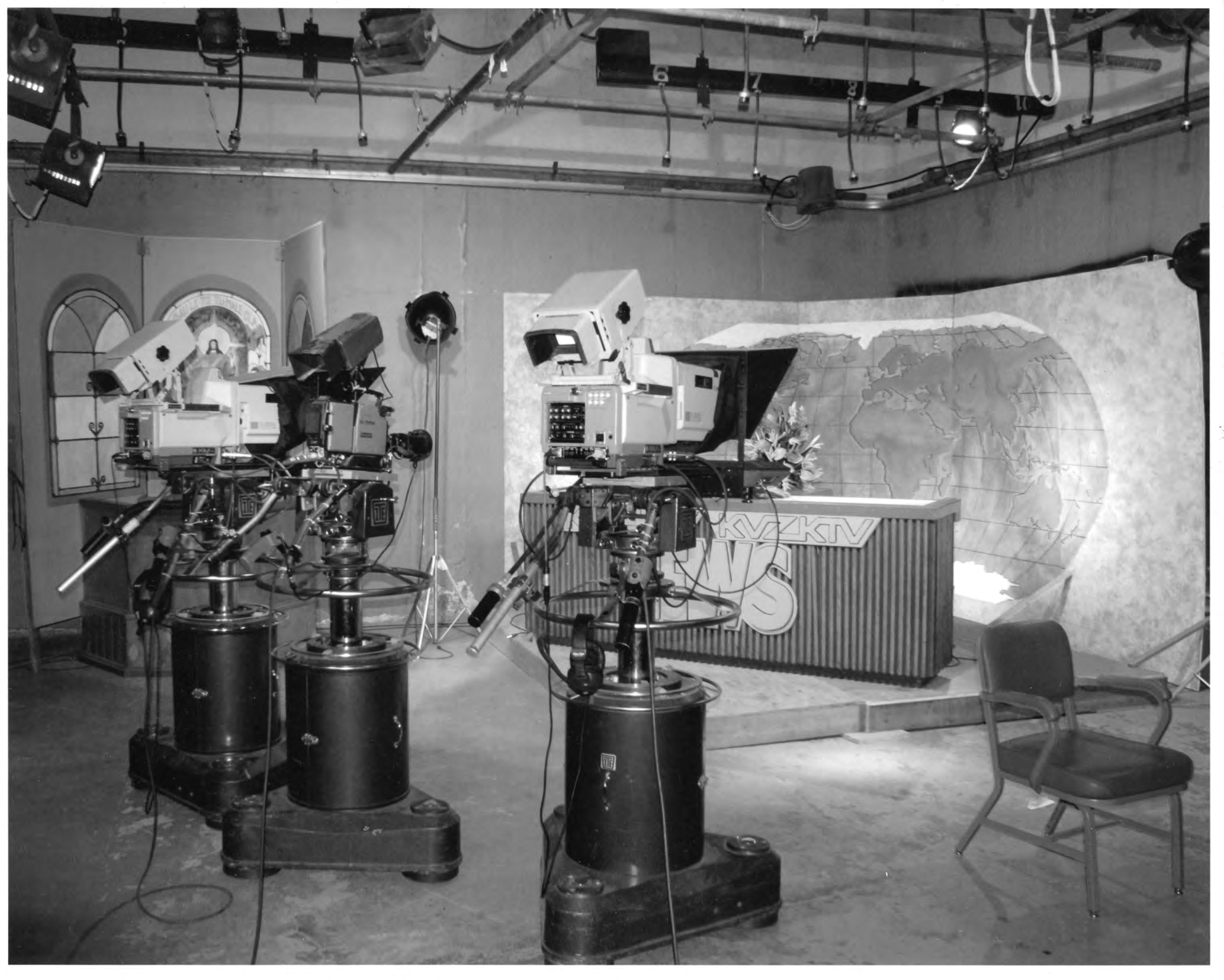

- Location within American Samoa
- Location: Route 118, N. side of Utulei, Utulei vicinity, Western District, American Samoa
- Coordinates: 14°16′41.1997″S 170°40′59.3148″W
- Area: less than 1 acre (0.40 ha)
- NRHP reference No.: 09000842
- Added to NRHP: October 23, 2009

The Michael J. Kirwan Educational Television Center, also known as KVZK-TV or KVZK Building, is a historic and current television center in Utulei, American Samoa. It is named for U.S. congressman Michael J. Kirwan, from Ohio, who took an interest in the development of American Samoa, and was instrumental in securing funding for a wide variety of improvements in the territory's infrastructure. It is a utilitarian concrete structure, roughly cruciform in shape, with a corrugated metal gable roof, located behind the Department of Education building on Route 1 in Utulei. It was built in 1964 as part of an innovative initiative to reform American Samoa's then-primitive educational facilities by broadcasting lessons from a central facility to the territory's remote schools. This initiative resulted in the widespread electrification of the territory's islands, and the construction of roads and new schools, and was widely regarded as a model for improving education in underdeveloped parts of the world. By the 1970s use of the broadcast facilities for education declined.

The building was listed on the U.S. National Register of Historic Places on October 23, 2009. The listing was announced as the featured listing in the National Park Service's weekly list of November 13, 2009.

== See also ==
- National Register of Historic Places listings in American Samoa
