= American Samoa Department of Education =

Government agency in American Samoa

American Samoa Department of Education (ASDOE) operates public schools in American Samoa, an insular area of the United States. American Samoa contains 23 primary schools, 10 secondary schools (of which five are operated by ASDOE), and the remaining 5 are either administered by religious denominations or privately owned.

Governor Clark Daniel Stearns established American Samoa's first Department of Public Education. He made plans for the establishment of a nursing school. He issued the Education Regulation of 1914, which became the foundation for education development in American Samoa for the next 40 years. The burden of providing school houses, housing for teachers and playgrounds were placed directly on the villages. The government supplied teachers. It was also during his term that education was made compulsory and schools were required to be open four days a week.

== Schools ==
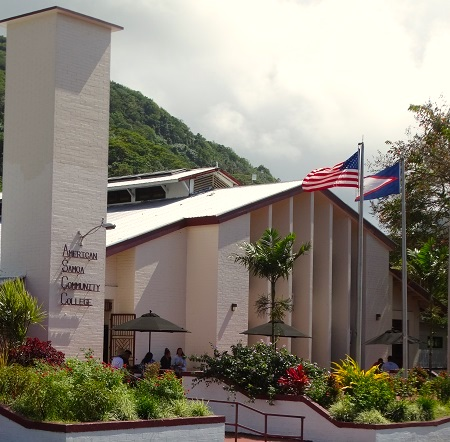
American Samoa Community College

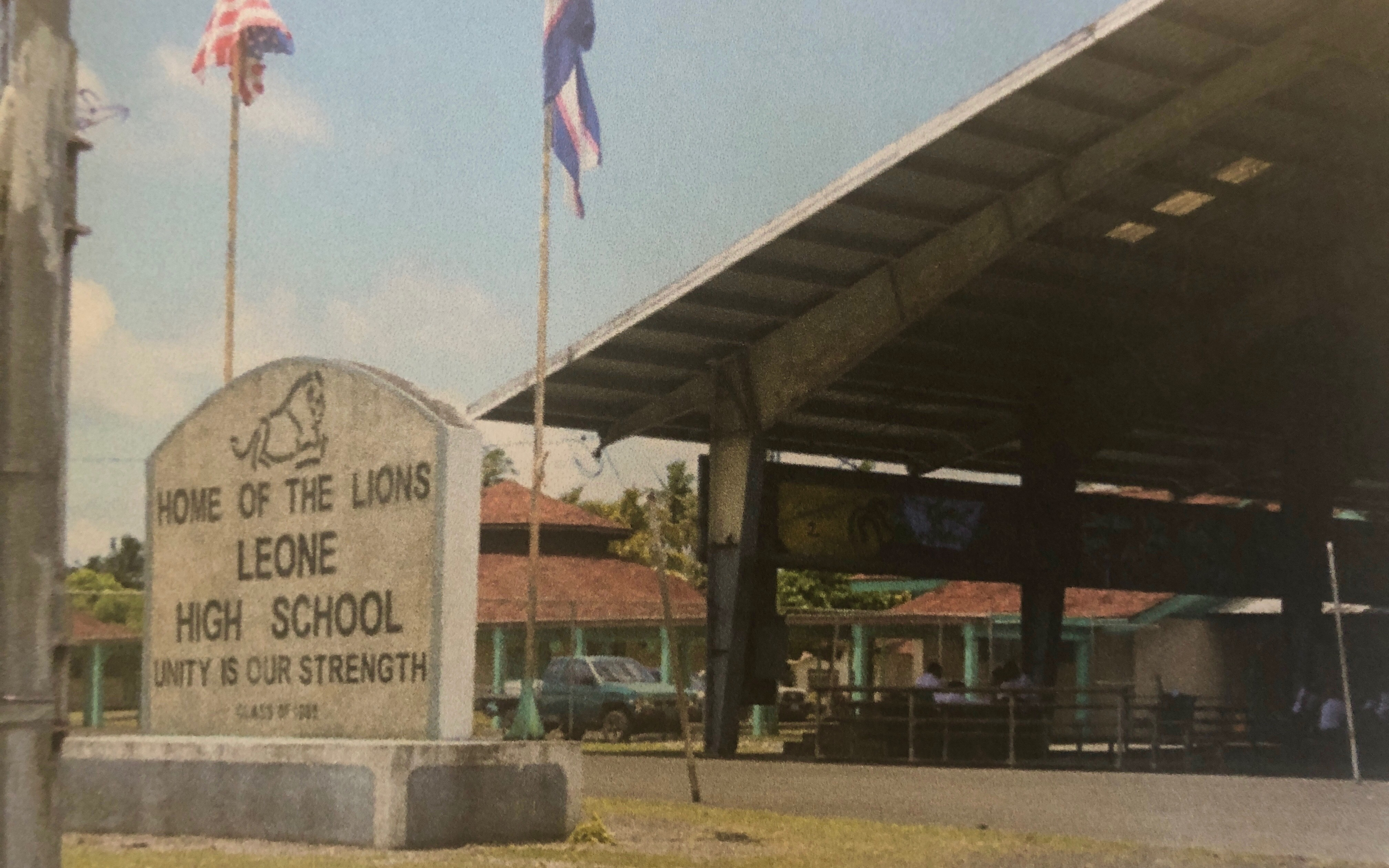
Leone High School

=== Colleges ===
- American Samoa Community College

=== Secondary schools ===
- Fagaitua Elementary school
- Leone High School
- Manu'a High School
- Nu'uuli Vocational Technical High School
- Samoana High School
- Tafuna High School
- Kanana Fou High School

=== Primary schools ===
- A.P. Lutali (Aunu'u) Elementary School
- Afono Elementary School
- Alatua Lua Elementary School
- Alofau Elementary School
- Aua Elementary School
- Fagasa Le'atele Elementary School
- Faleaso Elementary School
- Fitiuta Elementary School
- Lauli'i Elementary School
- Leone Midkiff Elementary School
- Lupelele Elementary School
- Manulele Elementary School
- Manulele Junior High School
- Masefau Elementary School
- Matafao Elementary School
- Matatula Elementary School
- Mt. Alava Elementary School
- Olomoana Elementary School
- Olosega Elementary School
- Pava'ia'i Elementary School
- Siliga Elementary School
- Taputapu Elementary School
- Tafuna Elementary School

Uifa'atali Peter Coleman Elementary School (Pago Pago)
