= Samoana High School =

High school in Utulei, American Samoa, United States

Coordinates: 14.2803°S 170.6840°W

Samoana High School (SHS) is a prominent high school in Utulei, a community in Maoputasi County, Eastern District, American Samoa. It is a part of the American Samoa Department of Education.

It opened in 1946 as High School of American Samoa, making it the first such school in the territory. It was established through the efforts of Mr. and Mrs. Matsinger from Kamehameha Schools in Hawai'i. Success was immediate and twenty graduates went on to colleges on the mainland or Hawai'i after the first two years. New buildings for the school were dedicated on May 20, 1949.

In a 1975 hearing in the U.S. Congress the school was referred to as the "Downtown" high school of American Samoa. Around that period the enrollment was expected to increase to 800–1,000.

A fire in 1979 burned down the school.

== Notable alumni ==
- Velega Savali, politician
- A. U. Fuimaono, politician
- Lolo Matalasi Moliga, 57th Governor of American Samoa
- Togiola Tulafono, 56th Governor of American Samoa
- Faoa Aitofele Sunia, former Lieutenant Governor of American Samoa
- Save Liuato Tuitele, politician
- Isaac Sopoaga, football player
- Marion Malena, Multiple Pageant Titleholder
- Deutsch Nuuelua Puu, MMA World Champion
- Tapai Alailepule Benjamin Vaivao, politician
- Kurt Taufa'asau, Head Football Coach at New Mexico Highlands University
