= Michael J. Kirwan =

American politician

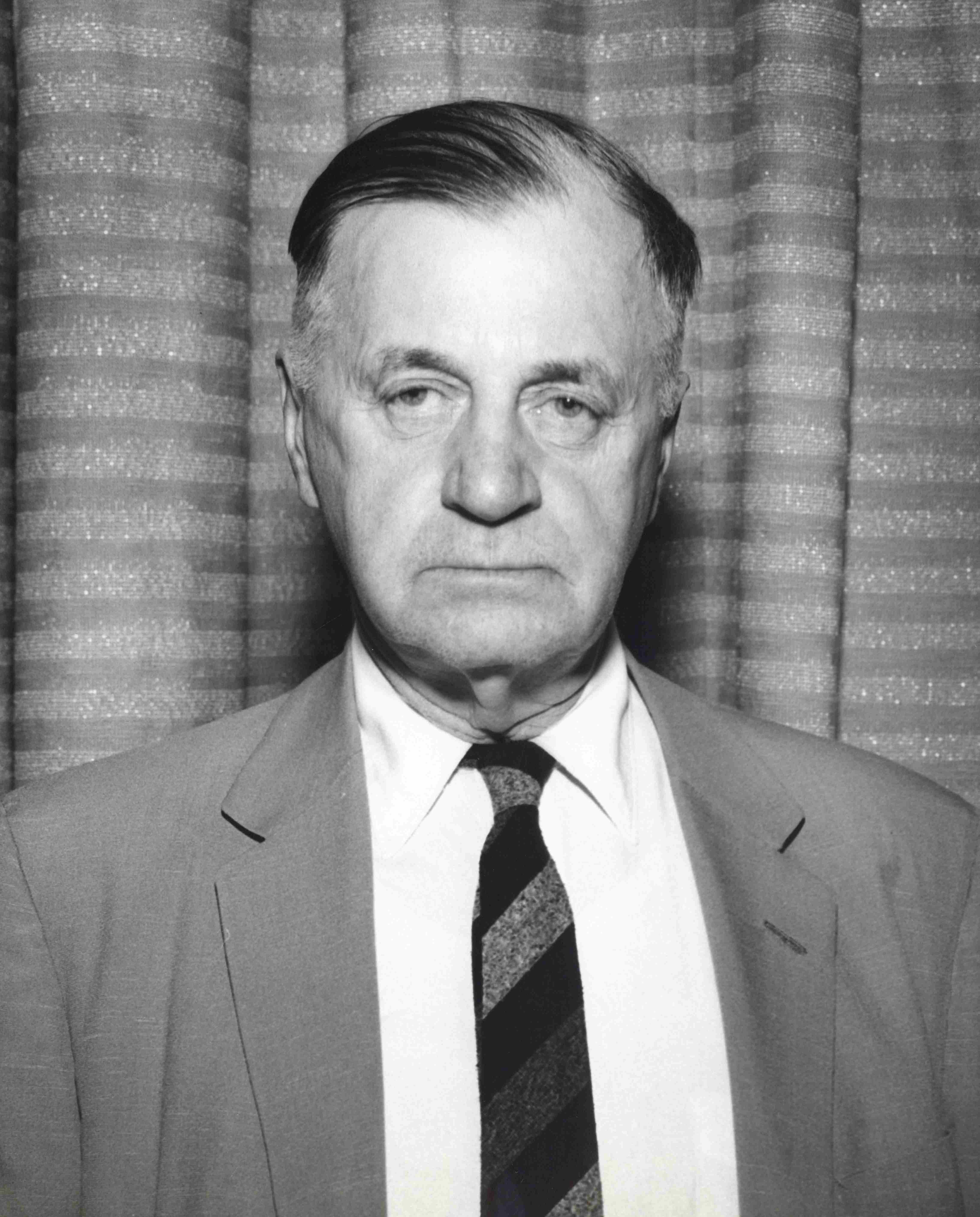

Member of the U.S. House of Representatives from Ohio's 19th district
- In office January 3, 1937 – July 27, 1970
- Preceded by: John G. Cooper
- Succeeded by: Charles J. Carney

Personal details
- Born: Michael Joseph Kirwan; December 2, 1886 Wilkes-Barre, Pennsylvania, U.S.
- Died: July 27, 1970 (aged 83) Bethesda, Maryland, U.S.
- Resting place: Calvary Cemetery; Youngstown, Ohio, U.S.
- Party: Democratic
- Spouse: Alice Kane
- Children: 3

Michael Joseph Kirwan (December 2, 1886 – July 27, 1970) was an American World War I veteran and Democratic politician from Ohio who served 17 terms as a representative to the United States Congress for the 19th electoral district of Ohio from 1937 until his death in 1970 in Bethesda, Maryland.

At the peak of his long congressional career, Kirwan was hailed as one of the most influential Democratic members of Congress, particularly on matters related to conservation.

== Early years ==
Mike Kirwan was born in Wilkes-Barre, Luzerne County, Pennsylvania, a manufacturing town in northeastern Pennsylvania. In 1907, he relocated to Youngstown, Ohio, a center of steel production located just west of the Pennsylvania border.

=== World War I ===
During the First World War Kirwan served overseas as a sergeant in the Three Hundred and Forty-eighth Machine Gun Company with the Sixty-fourth Artillery, United States Army. Records indicate he served between 1917 and 1919.

=== Marriage ===
Kirwan was married to Alice Kane. They had three children, John, Michael and Mary Alice.

== Political career ==
Upon his return to Youngstown, Kirwan established himself as an outspoken proponent of a plan to construct a Lake Erie to Ohio River canal – a proposal for which he would lobby tirelessly as Congressman from the 19th Congressional District of Ohio. Despite his later occupancy of important committee positions, however, Kirwan was unsuccessful in his efforts to achieve his most cherished goal as a lawmaker. Kirwan served on the Youngstown City Council from 1932 to 1936.

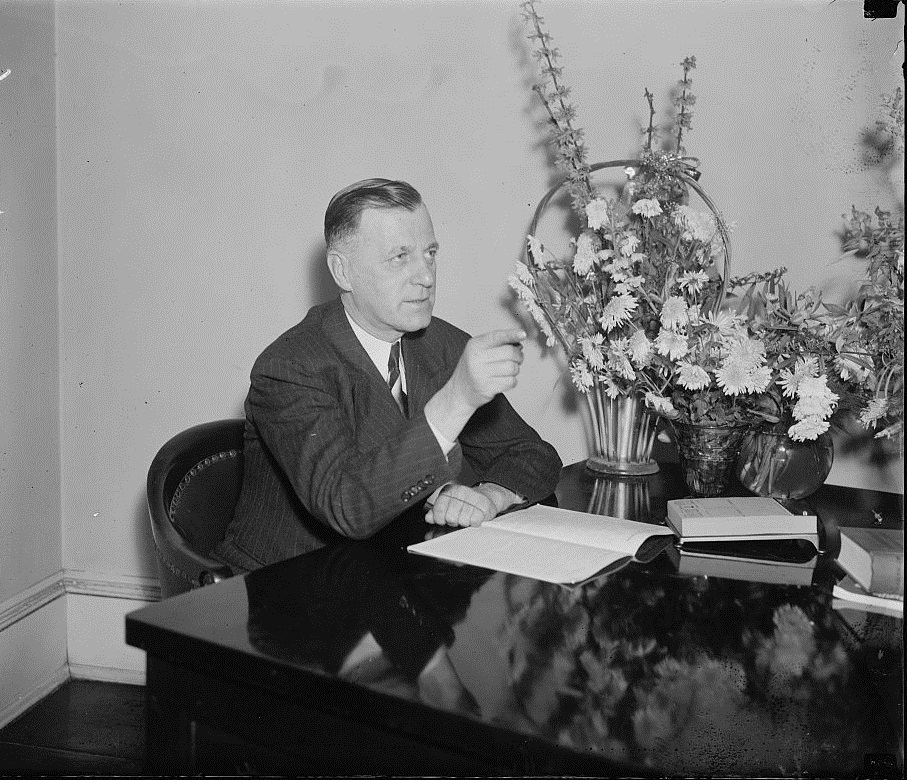
Kirwan in 1937

=== Tenure in Congress ===
In 1936, he ran for a seat in the U.S. House of Representatives, winning the first of 17 consecutive terms.

Throughout the 1930s and early 1940s, Kirwan was successful in garnering substantial federal support for a variety of public works projects including dams, reservoirs, public swimming pools, and public park facilities. In 1940, he also helped to secure government funding for the nation's first major housing project, Westlakes Housing Village (later known as Westlakes Terrace), which was situated west of downtown Youngstown. The housing project comprised 618 units capable of sheltering 2,500 people. Erected under government financing, the project received 90 percent of its funding ($2,862,000) on a 60-year loan basis. Upon its completion, Kirwan lauded the housing project as a welcome alternative to what had been a dilapidated residential district, and further declared that it would serve as a model for the nation.

In later years, Westlakes Terrace, like other low-income housing projects, yielded mixed results. The provision of cheap housing proved to be inadequate compensation for the loss of thousands of urban jobs, the decline of public transportation, the advent of suburbanization, and a host of other trends that adversely affected urban dwellers. Westlakes Terrace was recently converted to other purposes.

Powerful testimony to Kirwan's growing influence in the U.S. Congress came in 1948, when he was unanimously elected chairman of the Democratic Congressional Campaign Committee (DCCC), the first time a Northern Democrat had been named to that important post. In 1954, Kirwan was widely credited among Democratic Congressional leaders as the architect of the party's success in the November congressional elections. Despite his advancing years, he announced on December 3, 1957 (his 71st birthday) that he would seek a 12th term in Congress. The following year, Kirwan was among scores of Mahoning Valley Democratic candidates who secured sweeping victories; and in 1959, he was elected to his seventh term as chairman of the Democratic Congressional Campaign Committee.

=== Final years ===
Among the highlights of Kirwan's later career was an event held in his honor in 1959 at Youngstown's Idora Park Ballroom. The keynote speaker at that event was U.S. Senator John F. Kennedy, who would run successfully as the Democratic presidential nominee the following year. In 1968, after winning his 17th term as a congressman, Kirwan announced that he would retire from public office at the close of the term in 1970. In 1969, he was injured in a fall at the University Club in Washington, D.C., and was confined to Bethesda Naval Hospital.

== Death and burial ==
Kirwan experienced failing health for the next several months and died in Bethesda in 1970. His funeral was attended by more than 600 people, including a delegation of 50 members of Congress. He is buried at Calvary Cemetery, in Youngstown, Ohio.

== Legacy ==
While aspects of Kirwan's legacy have proved durable, the constituency he served was adversely affected by deindustrialization, which swept through much of northeastern Ohio starting in the late 1970s.

The primary educational television station in American Samoa bears Kirwan's name.

Kirwan was often an outspoken critic of the expansion of the Gettysburg National Military Park by way of U.S. Interior Department spending. He was once quoted as saying, "We have enough land at Gettysburg. There is no use taking any more."

Kirwan's papers are archived at Youngstown State University's Maag Library Archives and Special Collections.

The Michael J. Kirwan Reservoir impounds the west branch of the Mahoning River in Portage County, Ohio.

== Election results ==
Year	Democratic	Republican	Other
1968	Michael J. Kirwan: 101,813	Donald J. Lewis: 44,363
1966	Michael J. Kirwan: 86,975	Donald J. Lewis: 34,037
1964	Michael J. Kirwan: 111,682	Albert James: 34,654
1962	Michael J. Kirwan: 75,967	William Vincent Williams: 46,200
1960	Michael J. Kirwan: 102,874	Paul E. Stevens: 46,537
1958	Michael J. Kirwan: 93,660	Loren E. Van Brocklin: 31,192
1956	Michael J. Kirwan: 92,924	Ralph E. Turner: 42,293
1954	Michael J. Kirwan: 81,304	David S. Edwards: 33,352
1952	Michael J. Kirwan: 91,074	Allen Russell: 46,202
1950	Michael J. Kirwan: 119,245	Henry P. Kosling: 67,661
1948	Michael J. Kirwan: 134,408	William Bacon: 63,079
1946	Michael J. Kirwan: 88,872	Norman W. Adams: 59,607
1944	Michael J. Kirwan: 120,191	Herschel Hunt: 69,403
1942	Michael J. Kirwan: 60,248	James T. Begg: 46,567
1940	Michael J. Kirwan: 122,075	Charles H. Anderson: 75,016
1938	Michael J. Kirwan: 76,268	William P. Barnum: 69,214

== See also ==
- List of members of the United States Congress who died in office (1950–1999)
- Ohio's 19th congressional district

U.S. House of Representatives
Preceded by John G. Cooper	Member of the U.S. House of Representatives from Ohio's 19th congressional district 1937–1970	Succeeded by Charles J. Carney
