= Rainmaker Hotel =

Hotel in Pago Pago, American Samoa

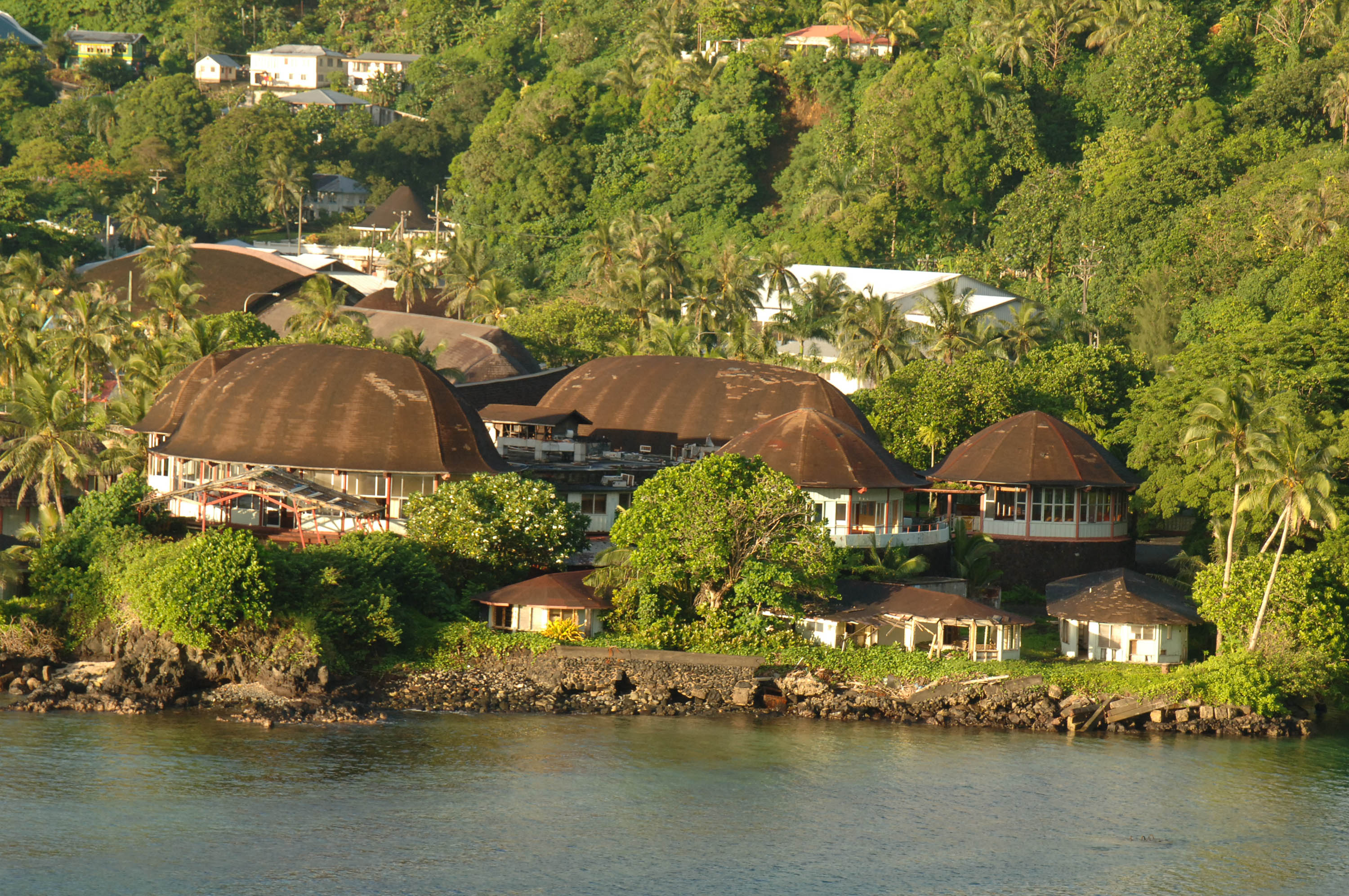
- In 2007

General information
- Location: Utule'i, Pago Pago, American Samoa.
- Coordinates: 14.2897°S 170.6800°W
- Opening: 1965

Other information
- Number of rooms: 250

Rainmaker Hotel was a 250-room luxury hotel in Utulei, Pago Pago, American Samoa. It was the only proper hotel in American Samoa and was operated by the government. The hotel was at its peak in the 1960s and 1970s, when it was known as the Pacific's Intercontinental Hotel.

== History ==
On February 21, 1964, it was reported in the Wall Street Journal that the Area Redevelopment Administration (ARA) had announced a million-dollar loan toward constructing a hotel in Pago Pago. The ARA stated in the article that “only tourism… offers a sound basis on which to restructure the economy.” It was anticipated that tourists would be arriving in increased numbers due to new scheduled flights. The paper notes that “if Samoa were independent… it would doubtless be getting a far costlier restructuring.”

The hotel was dedicated in November 1965. The four-day hotel opening celebrations began with a flag-raising at the Governor's Office on Flag Day, followed by a royal ‘ava ceremony conducted at the Fagatogo malae by Taumafaalofi and Aumaga of Nuʻuuli. The parade that followed was the longest in history. Several members of the U.S. Congress attended and the Air Force Band played music. Senator Alan Bible was the featured Flag Day speaker and the Department of the Interior sent its top officials. Governor John A. Burns came from Hawai'i with General Harris of the Air Force and Admiral Fabik of the Coast Guard. Prime Minister Mata'afa headed the Western Samoan delegation.

In 1980, an air disaster occurred when a US Navy plane hit the cables of the Mt. Alava aerial tramway and crashed into the hotel, killing the six servicemen aboard and two tourists who were staying at the hotel. The hotel manager reportedly refused that a memorial be erected inside the hotel grounds.

The hotel hosted most of the Miss Island Queen Pageant competitions between 1987 and 2001.

In May 2002 the hotel was ordered to pay a US$400,000 overdue power bill to the American Samoa Power Authority. In March 2003 the ASPA cut off its power for a night after failing to receive payment.

In 2004 the government agreed to lease part of the hotel to businessman Tom Drabble. In August 2004 the American Samoan Senate rejected a government bail-out plan.

In 2014 it was announced that the derelict hotel would be demolished. It was demolished in 2015 after sitting deserted for over a decade.
