= Owen Aspinall =

Governor of American Samoa

Owen Stuart Aspinall
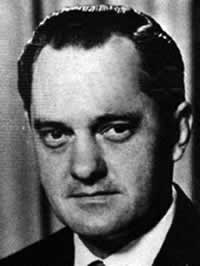

45th Governor of American Samoa
- In office August 1, 1967 – July 31, 1969
- Preceded by: Hyrum Rex Lee
- Succeeded by: John Morse Haydon

Secretary of American Samoa
- In office November 1962 – July 31, 1967
- Governor: Hyrum Rex Lee

Attorney General of American Samoa
- In office 1961 – November 1962
- Governor: Hyrum Rex Lee

Personal details
- Born: September 21, 1927 Grand Junction, Colorado
- Died: February 7, 1997 (aged 69) Mesa County, Colorado
- Resting place: Orchard Mesa Cemetery
- Party: Democratic
- Spouse: Taotafa Lutu Aspinall
- Education: University of Denver (BA); American University (LLB)
- Occupation: Attorney

Military service
- Allegiance: United States
- Branch/service: United States Army
- Unit: 504th Infantry Regiment; 82nd Airborne Division

Owen Stuart Aspinall (September 21, 1927 – February 7, 1997) was an American attorney and politician who served as the 45th Governor of American Samoa from August 1, 1967, to July 31, 1969. He was born in Grand Junction, Colorado; his father was longtime United States Representative Wayne N. Aspinall. After serving in the United States Army during World War II, Aspinall earned his Bachelor of Laws from American University. He served in three government positions before becoming the Governor of American Samoa: the Deputy District Attorney of Mesa County, Colorado; Attorney General of American Samoa; and eventually Secretary of American Samoa, the islands' equivalent of a lieutenant governor.

While governor, Aspinall dealt with a number of issues, including educational system reform and the subsequent resignation of many teachers and school personnel. He signed a bill from the American Samoa Fono that would eventually give American Samoa a Delegate to the United States House of Representatives in the 1980s. He made a number of controversial decisions, including forbidding Korean and Samoan intermarriage. He helped bring an end to extreme violence between Korean and Chinese fisherman in Samoan waters.

== Life ==
Aspinall was born on September 21, 1927, in Grand Junction, Colorado. His father was Wayne N. Aspinall, United States Representative from Colorado's 4th congressional district and his mother Julia Edith Kuns Aspinall. Following his military service, Aspinall attended the University of Denver, graduating with a Bachelor of Arts in Anthropology in 1949. He graduated with a Bachelor of Laws from American University in 1955, and set up a law practice. He spent many years in American Samoa, and married a Samoan woman in December 1966.

=== Military service ===
During World War II, Aspinall served with the 504th Infantry Regiment, an airborne force. Later in the war, he served with the 82nd Airborne Division.

== Political career ==
His first political post was as Deputy District Attorney of Mesa County, Colorado, which he held from 1957 to 1961. He went on to become the Attorney General of American Samoa later in 1961. In November 1962, he became the Secretary of American Samoa, the second-in-command of the Samoan executive branch.

== Governorship ==
Aspinall became Governor of American Samoa on August 1, 1967. As governor, he came into conflict with the National Association of Educational Broadcasters over how the local school systems were run, and refused to renew the organization's contract. This caused many school teachers and administrators to resign their posts. He was accused of wiretapping phones on the islands, but none of his critics were able to produce evidence of any activity. He signed a bill out of the American Samoa Fono into law, against the wishes of the Department of the Interior, to send a Delegate to the United States House of Representatives from American Samoa.

Along with traditionally garbed island chiefs, Aspinall was one of the first officials to greet and congratulate the crew of Apollo 10 after the success of their mission.

He drew criticism for forbidding a Samoan woman from marrying a Korean man; the two sued the governor. Aspinall defended his decision by stating he was keeping disgruntled fishermen from jumping ship in Samoa; he sought to keep Samoa "for Samoans", despite the fact that he married a Samoan woman himself.

Aspinall had to contend with violent clashes between Korean and Chinese ethnic groups who fought with knives and clubs off the shore. He requested riot gear to put down the violence. The incidents began when a Korean fishing boat rammed a Chinese one, ultimately causing it to sink in the storm. The governor had to separate Japanese, Chinese, and Korean vessels to keep the fishing companies running between the islands. At one point, Aspinall had to close the port of Pago Pago.

When Richard Nixon became President of the United States, Aspinall handed in a pro forma resignation, as the Secretary of the Interior was likely to soon replace him with a Republican. His term as governor ended on July 31, 1969.

Government offices
Preceded by Hyrum Rex Lee	Governor of American Samoa; 1967–69	Succeeded by John Morse Haydon
