= Matthew Hunkin =

English missionary (1815–1888)

Matthew 'Mataiō' Hunkin (22 September 1815 – 15 April 1888) was an English trader, diplomat, and missionary in the London Missionary Society. He was one of the first Europeans to settle in the Samoan Islands and is the co-founder of what may be the oldest lineage of mixed European and Samoan origin. In his later years, he became a United States consular agent on the island of Tutuila and a notable landowner in Leone.

== Early life ==
Hunkin was born in Mevagissey, Cornwall, England.

== Career ==
Hunkin arrived in Pago Pago, American Samoa in 1834 and joined Archie Murray under the patronage of high chief Mauga. The two toured villages on Tutuila's eastern coast, then moved to Leone, American Samoa, where Murray started planning the Mission Institute for Pacific Islanders at Fagalele on the village's outskirts.

In 1836, Hunkin became one of the first Europeans to settle in Samoa. After building a boat for King Tui Manuʻa in the Manuʻa Islands, he resided in Leone. Recognized by the London Missionary Society as an assistant missionary, Hunkin later attempted to evangelize in Niue. He left the church in 1849, opened one of Tutuila's earliest shops in Leone, and donated land there for mission houses.

Hunkin's effort to open Niue to the London Missionary Society fell short, after which he managed the society's station in the Manuʻa Islands. He left the mission in 1849 and reinvented himself as a trader, U.S. consular agent for Tutuila, and landholder in Leone

The U.S. consul in Apia also hired him as a tender. In 1888 U.S. Consul Harold M. Sewall advised closing the Tutuila agency, suggesting the U.S. Navy employ Hunkin directly to oversee the coal depot in Pago Pago. Hunkin died a few months before any decision was finalized.

== Personal life ==
In February 1838, Hunkin married Fatumalala Fai'ivae Aumavae Ilaoa in Leone. She was the daughter of Leone's High Chief Faiivae. The couple had four sons and three daughters. He is the founder of what may be the oldest lineage of mixed European and Samoan origin.

Hunkin died on 15 April 1888, in Leone, American Samoa.
