= Leone, American Samoa =

Leone
- Village
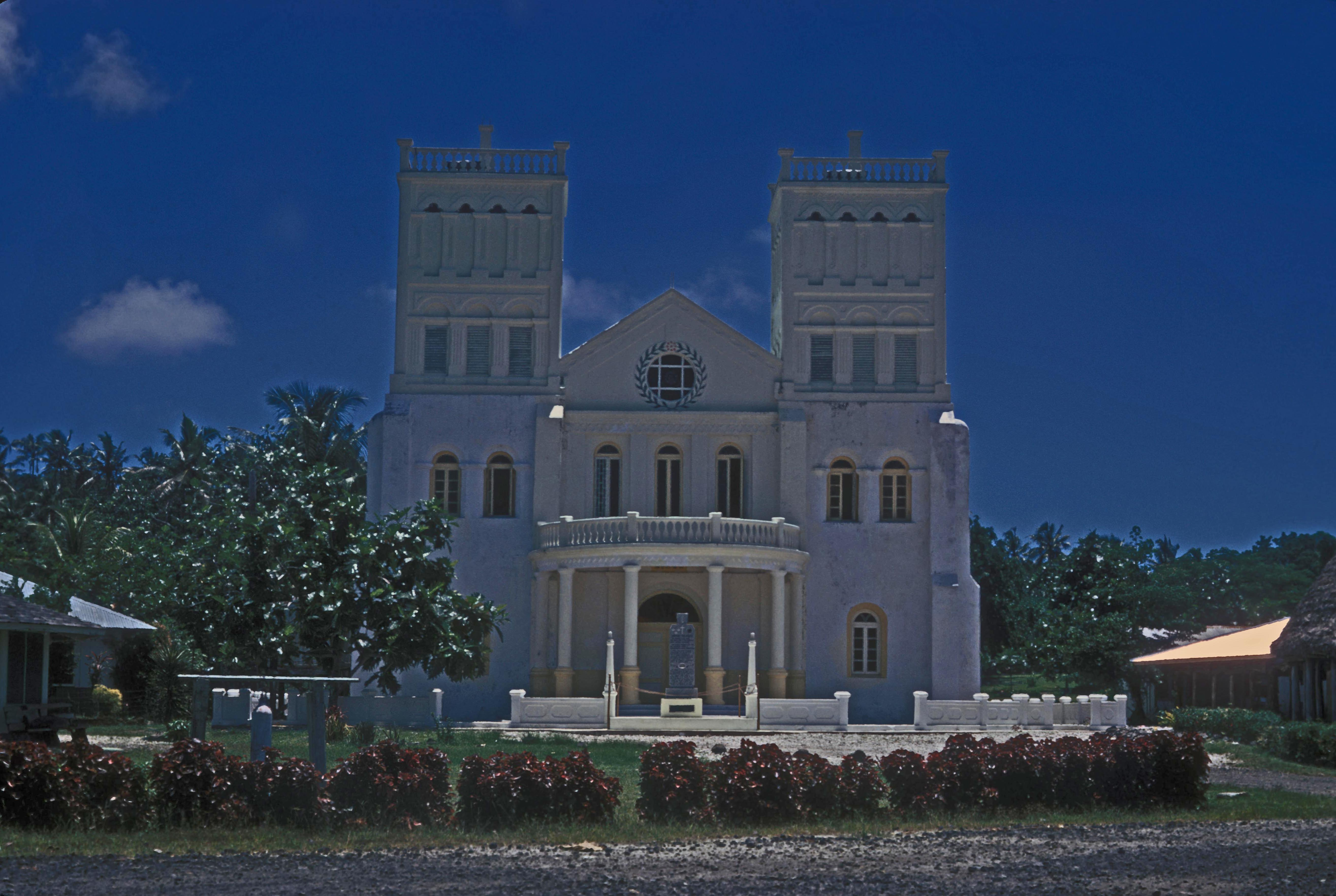
- Zion Church (Siona)
- Etymology: Samoan: le one ("no famine")
- Nickname: "Leone o le Tinā o le Alofa"
- Location within American Samoa
- Coordinates: 14°20′38″S 170°47′06″W
- Country: United States
- Territory: American Samoa
- Island: Tutuila
- District: Western
- County: Lealataua

Government
  - Type: Village Council
  - Mayor: Ropati Opa

Area
  - Total: 2.37 sq mi (6.13 km^{2})

Population (2020)
  - Total: 1,598
  - Density: 675/sq mi (261/km^{2})
- Time zone: Samoa Time Zone
- ZIP code: 96799
- Area code: +1 684

Leone is the second-largest city on Tutuila Island's west coast. The village is on the south-west coast of Tutuila Island, American Samoa. Leone was the ancient capital of Tutuila Island. Leone was also where the Samoan Islands’ first missionary, John Williams, visited on October 18, 1832. A monument in honor of Williams has been erected in front of Zion Church. Its large church was the first to be built in American Samoa. It has three towers, a carved ceiling and stained glass. Until steamships were invented, Leone was the preferred anchorage of sailing ships which did not risk entering Pago Pago Harbor. Much early contact between Samoans and Europeans took place in Leone. In the early 20th century, Leone was one of the centers for the Mau movement in American Samoa.

The village is home to some of the oldest buildings on Tutuila Island. Besides the oldest church in American Samoa, Leone is home to a post office, high school, Pritchard's Bakery, Noela’s Gas Station and Kruse Supermarket. Buses from Fagatogo to Leone leave every few minutes throughout the year. An airstrip was built at Leone during World War II. The village is home to two historical sites listed on the U.S. National Register of Historic Places: Fagalele Boys School, which may be the oldest building on Tutuila Island, and Tataga-Matau Fortified Quarry Complex.

Until the invention of the motorboat, Pago Pago Harbor was of little value as the ships were unable to turn around in such a confined area. The most common anchorage was therefore in Leone, where the first missionaries also arrived. Its strategic location, directly over the southern horizon from Upolu Island, and the district Atua, has made Leone a major resting port for those traveling between Upolu, Tutuila, and the Manu'a Islands. Leone is now a lively municipal center. The origin of several of Leone's chiefly titles can be traced to Western Samoa.

== Etymology ==
The name originated from a famine that devastated Tutuila Island before modern history. Oral history shared through generations of ancestry recorded that Leone did not experience starvation during this famine; instead, the village had an abundance of food and other necessities, hence the name “Leone” which derives from “Le” (no) and “One” (famine). During the famine, the villagers in Leone provided food and commodities for nearby villages and for families from further away. This earned the village the prestigious title “Leone o le Tinā o le Alofa”, which means “Leone is the Mother of Love.” The village's musical emblem is a living recording of this historical representation. Another source translates the village name Leone in English as "The Sands".

== History ==
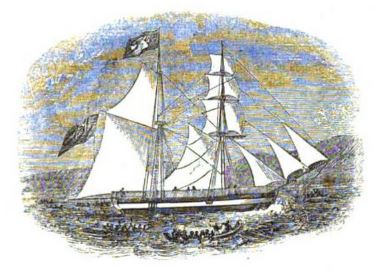
The Messenger of Peace

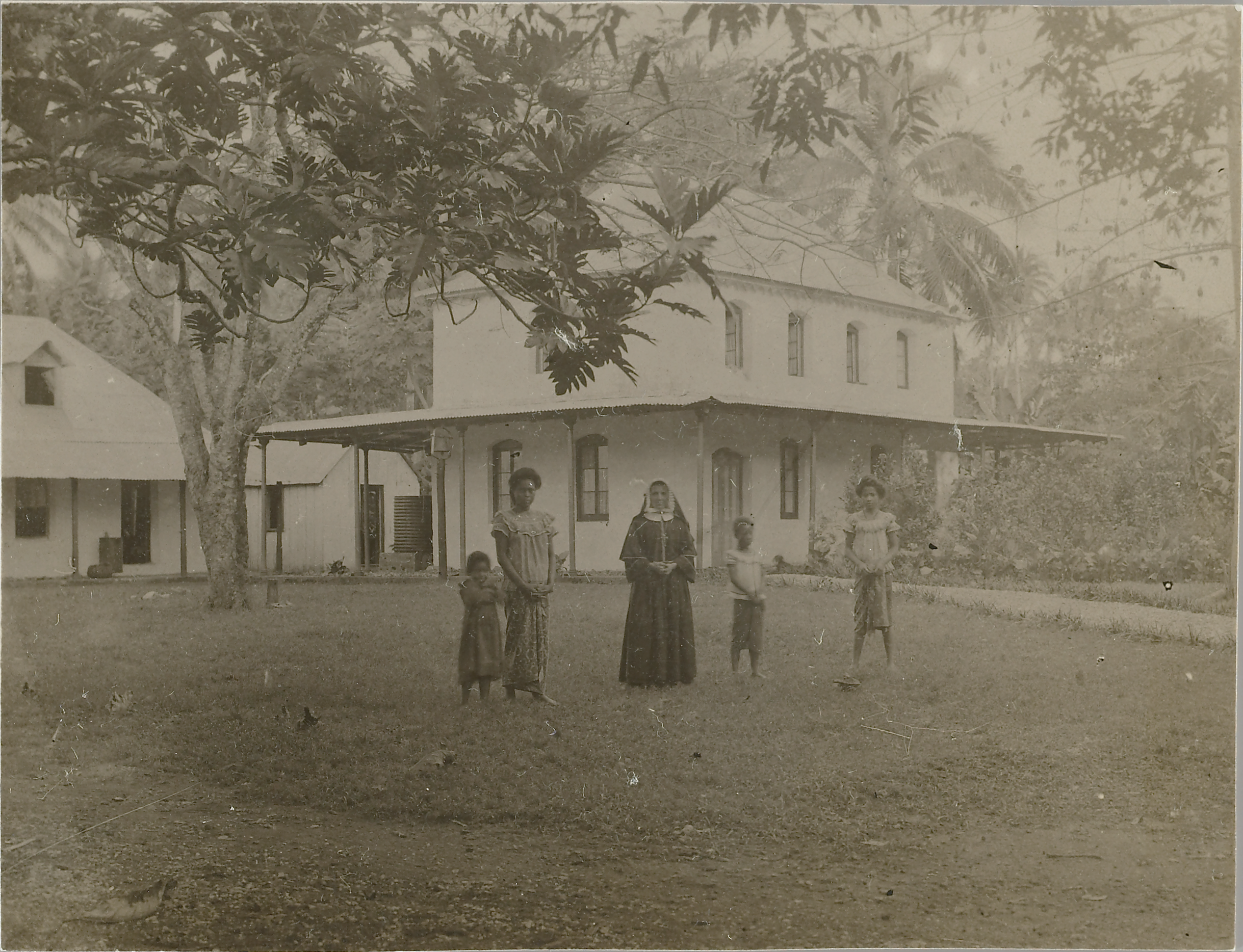
Leone, 1907.

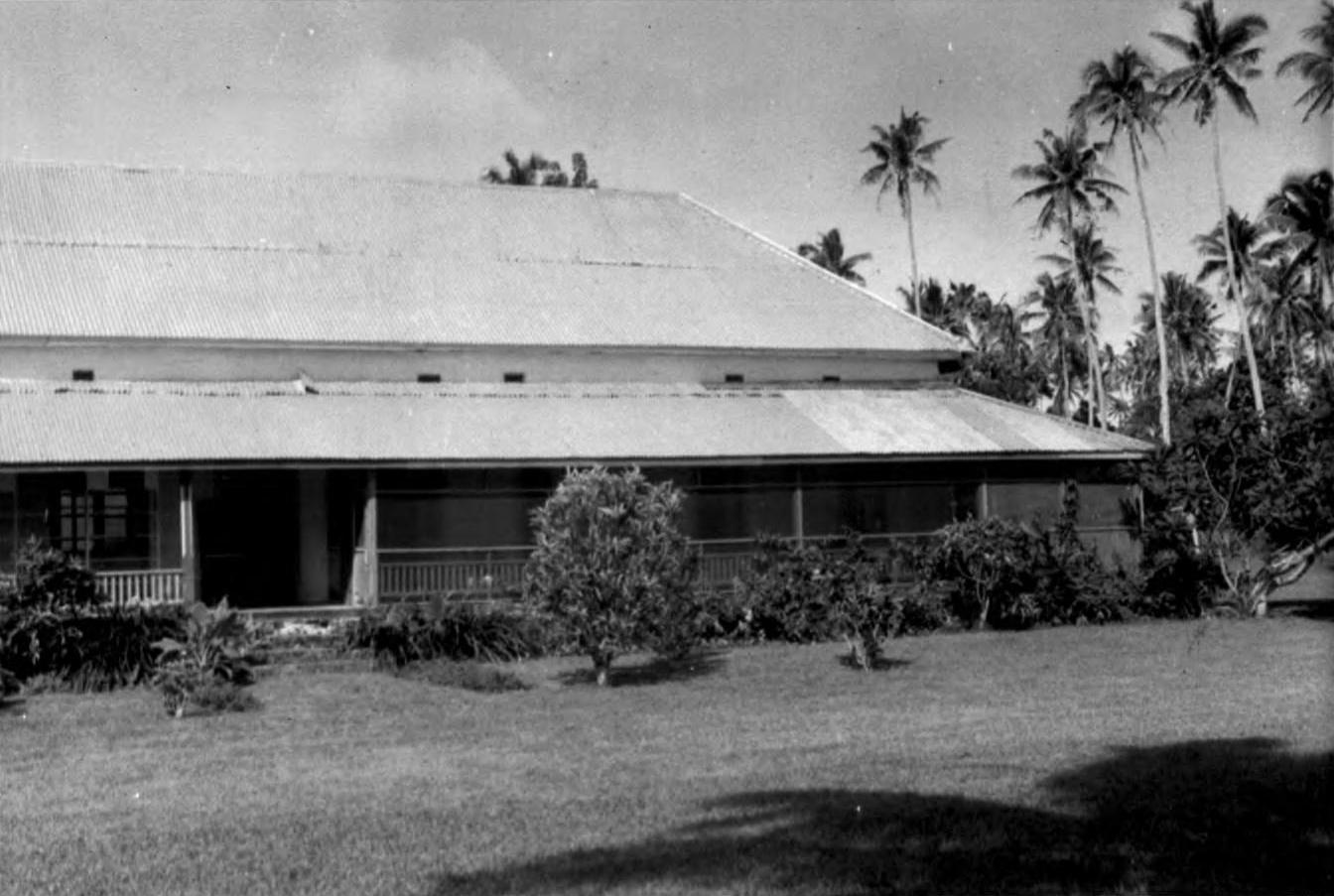
Fagalele Boys School in Leone may be the oldest building on Tutuila Island.

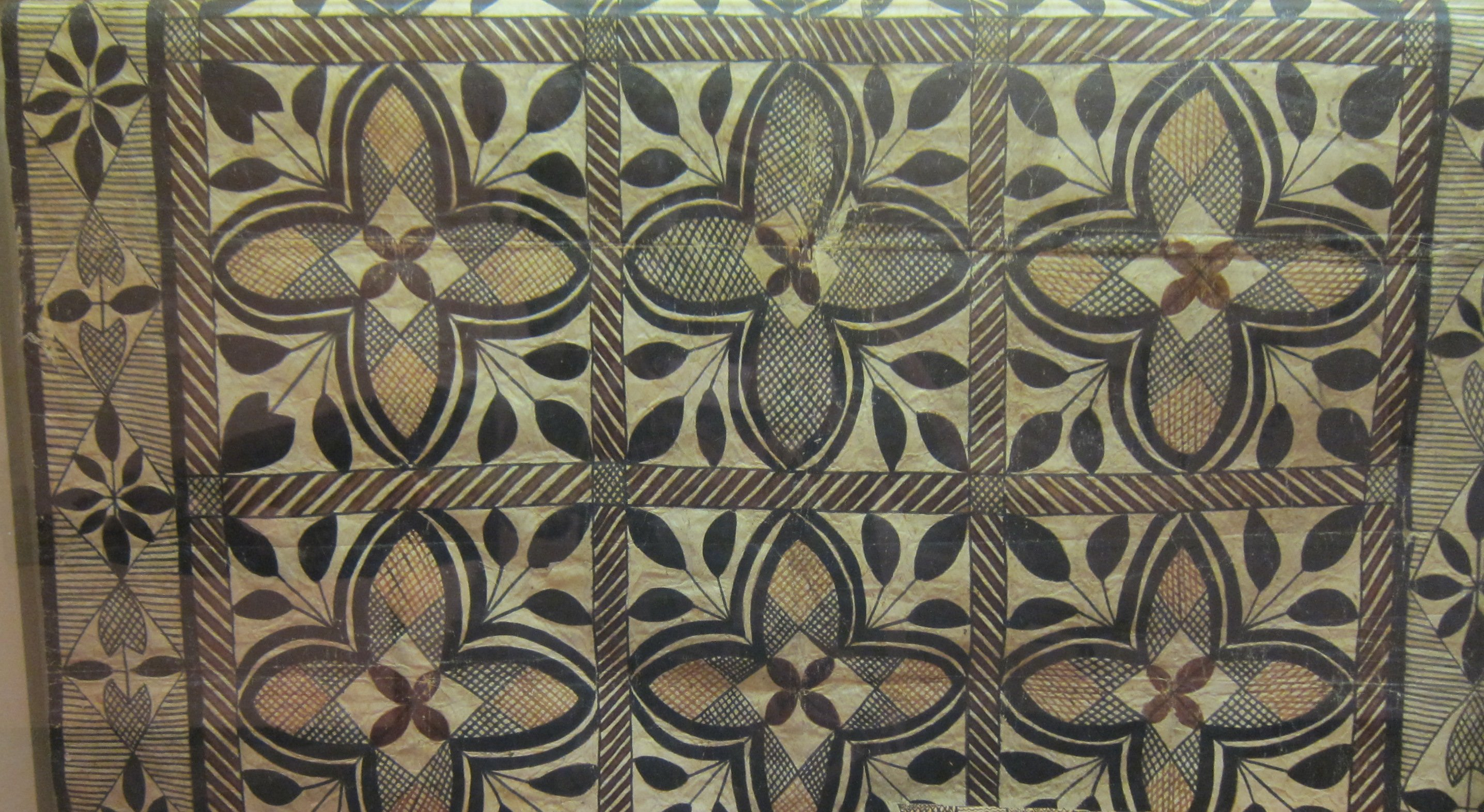
Leone siapo.

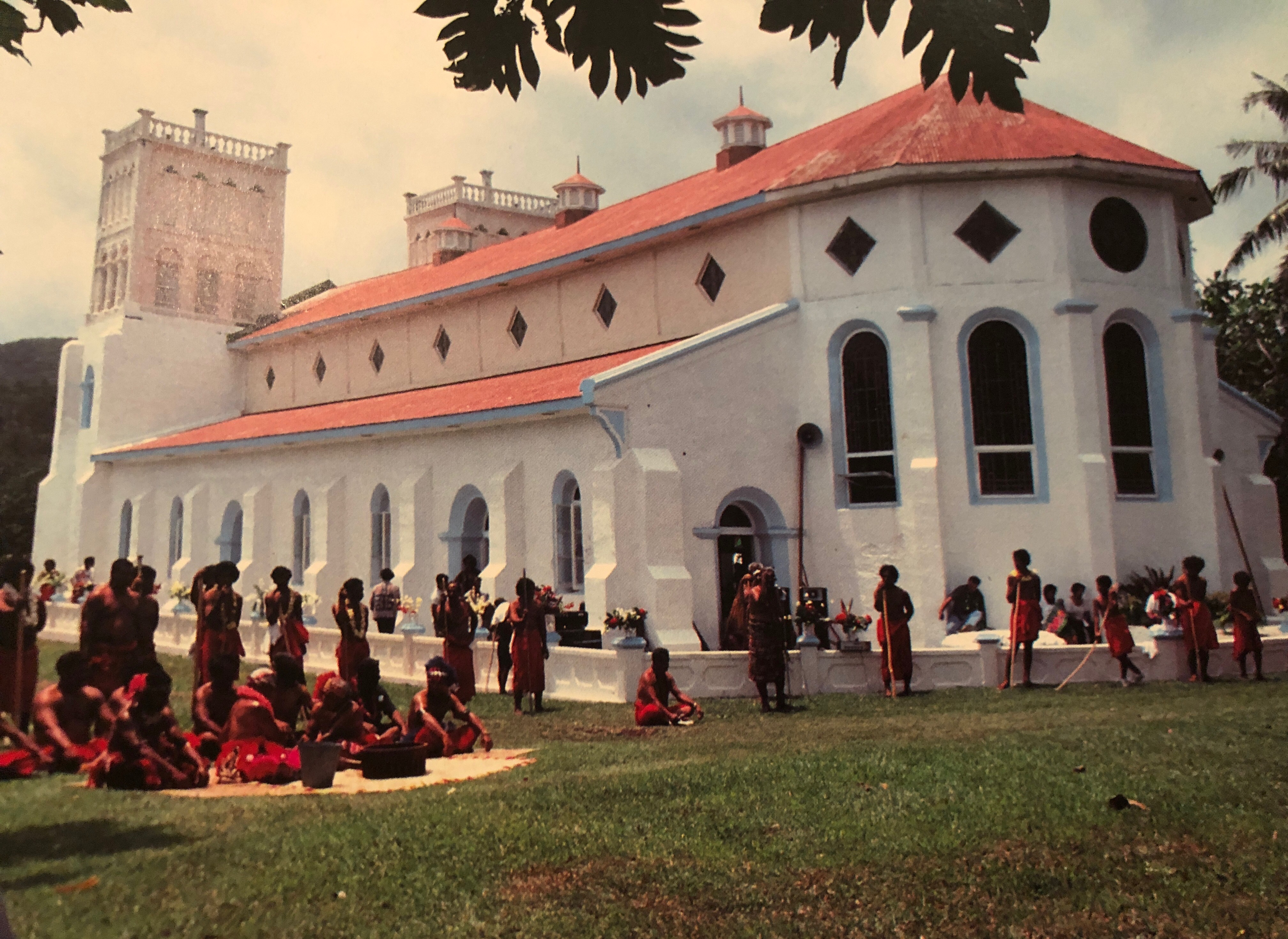
Church in Leone

Leone holds the distinction of being one of American Samoa's oldest settlements. It was the ancient capital of Tutuila Island. The Leone Quarry, recognized on the U.S. National Register of Historic Places, is among the earliest excavation sites on Tutuila Island, with evidence of occupation dating back to around 200 CE. The first petroglyphs to be found in the Samoan Islands were discovered at Leone’s lagoon.

In 1980, Jeffrey Clark discovered a potsherd on Malaloto Ridge in Leone, marking the earliest documented prehistoric ceramic uncovered in American Samoa. The Tataga-Matau Fortified Quarry Complex, located on a series of ridges inland from Leone, has been the focus of an extensive multi-year research project. This site holds significant archaeological value for understanding the prehistory of Samoa. Its importance is further underscored by evidence that adzes produced at this quarry were widely distributed across the Western Pacific. Adzes of distinctively Samoan typology - crafted from fine, dark basalt and originating in Leone - have been uncovered across a vast region, stretching from Lau in Fiji to Tokelau in the north and westward to the outer eastern Solomon Islands.

=== 19th century ===
On October 18, 1832, when missionary John Williams returned to the Samoan Islands, he dropped anchor in Leone Bay onboard the Messenger of Peace, but did not want to go directly ashore as he feared it was A'asu, site of the massacre of French sailors. Williams was surprised when village chief Amoamo paddled out to his ship to assure him that it would be safe to come ashore. The chief explained that a group of Tahitians who had landed at Sapapaliʻi — under the guidance of an Englishman called Viliamu — had already introduced the Christian faith to the local people. When Williams revealed that he was Viliamu, a grand celebration took place within the Samoan-style church at Leone, led by Chief Amoamo. In Leone, Williams went ashore and, though initially startled by what he saw as the people's savage appearance, he was nevertheless warmly welcomed. Later, Leone's Chief Amoamo served as the missionaries’ interpreter and played the most influential role in introducing the Christian faith to Tutuila Island. Williams’ visit made Leone the first village on Tutuila Island to formally receive Christian teachings.

In 1836, Rev. Archibald Wright Murray of the London Missionary Society arrived on Tutuila Island. He stayed in both Leone and Pago Pago before leaving the island in 1849. Reverend Barnden was also assigned to Leone in the 1830s. The missionaries chose to establish their headquarters at Leone. This was the beginning of the formal missionization of Tutuila. At the time, the village was twice as populated as Pago Pago and served as capital of the Western District.

In 1836, Englishman Matthew Hunkin married Fatumalala Faiivae of Leone, the daughter of High Chief Faiivae of Leone. Hunkin was among the first Europeans to settle in the Samoan Islands. After building a boat for King Tuimanua in Manua, he lived with a family in Leone. The London Missionary Society granted him the status of assistant missionary, and he later made an attempt to spread the gospel to Niue. Hunkin resigned from the church in 1849 and went on to establish one of Tutuila's first shops in Leone. He also donated land to the church for mission houses in Leone.

On October 11, 1839, Commodore Charles Wilkes of the United States Exploring Expedition visited Leone. Midshipman William Reynolds was assigned surveying duty under Lieutenant Joseph Underwood. In the village, they were introduced to Chief Tuitele, who was happy to welcome them as guests for the night. In his diary, Reynolds described the gentleness and civility of the villagers. He wrote: “I noticed in the men, a fondness & care displayed towards their children,” and went on to write: “While on the beach many huge fellows had infants & babbling youngsters in their arms.” He later questioned whether “these people have more claim to be good than we.” Reynolds promised Chief Tuetila that he would clothe “him as a Papalangi” (white person) if he would show up to their ship on their return. The chief came, but Captain Charles Wilkes refused to see Chief Tuetila.

In 1840, John Jackson (William Diaper), an Englishman from Ardleigh, arrived in Leone. He had been kidnapped months earlier on Taʻū Island while on a whaling voyage and managed to flee on a passing ship. Contemplating a future in Leone, he considered becoming a trader, noting that “the natives were all Christians in this place,” at least nominally, as mission work had begun four years prior. Jackson recounts that he found a woman he wished to marry, but when he asked the missionary to perform the ceremony, his request was denied on the grounds that he would likely not remain and might abandon his wife. Jackson ultimately departed for Fiji, catching a vessel from Pago Pago.

In 1857, due to the large interest among locals for Christianity and its teachings, the Fagalele Boys School was established. The school's purpose was to train locals to become missionaries. Later, the school became a part of the Congregational Christian Church in American Samoa (CCCAS).

In 1862, the Roman Catholic Church was officially established in Leone. The Catholic church arrived in Leone under the stewardship of Father Elloy. The Catholics initially encountered strong opposition from some of the village chiefs. Leone soon became the Catholic seat on Tutuila Island.

On October 8, 1873, U.S. consul Albert Barnes Steinberger arrived in Leone and discovered that High Chiefs Tuitele and Sātele had approved a message from the Taimua — a seven-chief council in Western Samoa — addressed to the President of the United States. This message sought advice on preserving Samoa's sovereignty and determining its governmental structure.

In 1877, Leone played a central role in the Tutuila War, a conflict driven by deep divisions among Samoans over their government's future. The Apia-based leadership of the Samoan Islands, fearing the rise of the Puletua opposition, sent their delegate Mamea to Washington, D.C., to negotiate with the U.S. During his absence, the Puletua faction launched a rebellion, sparking a war in Tutuila. Government forces in Leone moved to quell the uprising, advancing on Pago Pago where the rebel leader Mauga was located. They burned all buildings in Pago Pago and chased Mauga and his followers to Aunu’u Island. Finding Aunu’u unable to support their forces, the Puletua returned to Tutuila and established a defensive position on the north coast. Reverend Charles Phillips of the LMS persuaded Mauga to surrender, leading the Puletua to retreat to Leone. There, they submitted themselves for several hours before, after a lengthy trial, they were released upon paying fines.

In 1883, the Missionary Sisters of the Society of Mary (SMSM) established a school in Leone which later got the name St. Theresa's School.

On June 18, 1888, Elder Joseph Henry Dean founded the first branch of the Church of Jesus Christ of Latter-day Saints at Leone.

In 1889, amid the Samoan Civil War, American Colonel William Blacklock notified the U.S. Department of State that Edward Ripley — a chief from Leone — was urging Leone's residents to refuse recognition of Malietoa Laupepa as Samoa's king. Identified as a Tupua Tamasese stronghold, Leone continued flying the rebel flag and displaying resistance.

In 1890, Alfred J. Pritchard, grandson of the missionary George Pritchard, married Lemusu Fuiavailiili of Savaiʻi and settled in Leone, where they opened a business.

In the 1890s, the Roman Catholic Mission established a school for girls in Leone.

In 1899, when Tutuila Island became part of the United States, the district known as Fofo ma Itulagi included much of the current Western District. Its center was in Leone under the leadership of High Chief Tuitele. Two key orator chiefs, the Olo and the Leoso, represented the Western District. Leoso's residence in Leone bore the name O le Faletele i Sisifo, or "The Great House of the West".

On April 17, 1900, four of Leone's traditional chiefs (PCs Tuitele Penikila and Faiivae Pauga Leta, and HTCs Olo Malaki and Le´oso Fiavivini (Tama Matua)), signed the Deed of Cession. This officially formed the current relationship with American Samoa and the United States. Leone is the only village to have had this unique recognition and honor.

In 1900, an incident highlighted the first major conflict between Samoan custom and U.S. law. A man named Fagaima of Tuālāuta County caught and prepared a skipjack tuna, a fish traditionally reserved for high chiefs. High Chief Letuli of Tuālāuta ordered Fagaima’s house and crops destroyed and banished him from the county. Fagaima sought refuge with High Chief Tuitele of Leone, who was also District Governor of the Western District. When Letuli disregarded Tuitele’s summons, Tuitele referred the matter to Governor Benjamin Franklin Tilley. Letuli was subsequently arrested, found guilty of violating U.S. law, ordered to compensate Fagaima, confined to Pago Pago for one year, and temporarily stripped of his chiefly authority.

=== 20th century ===
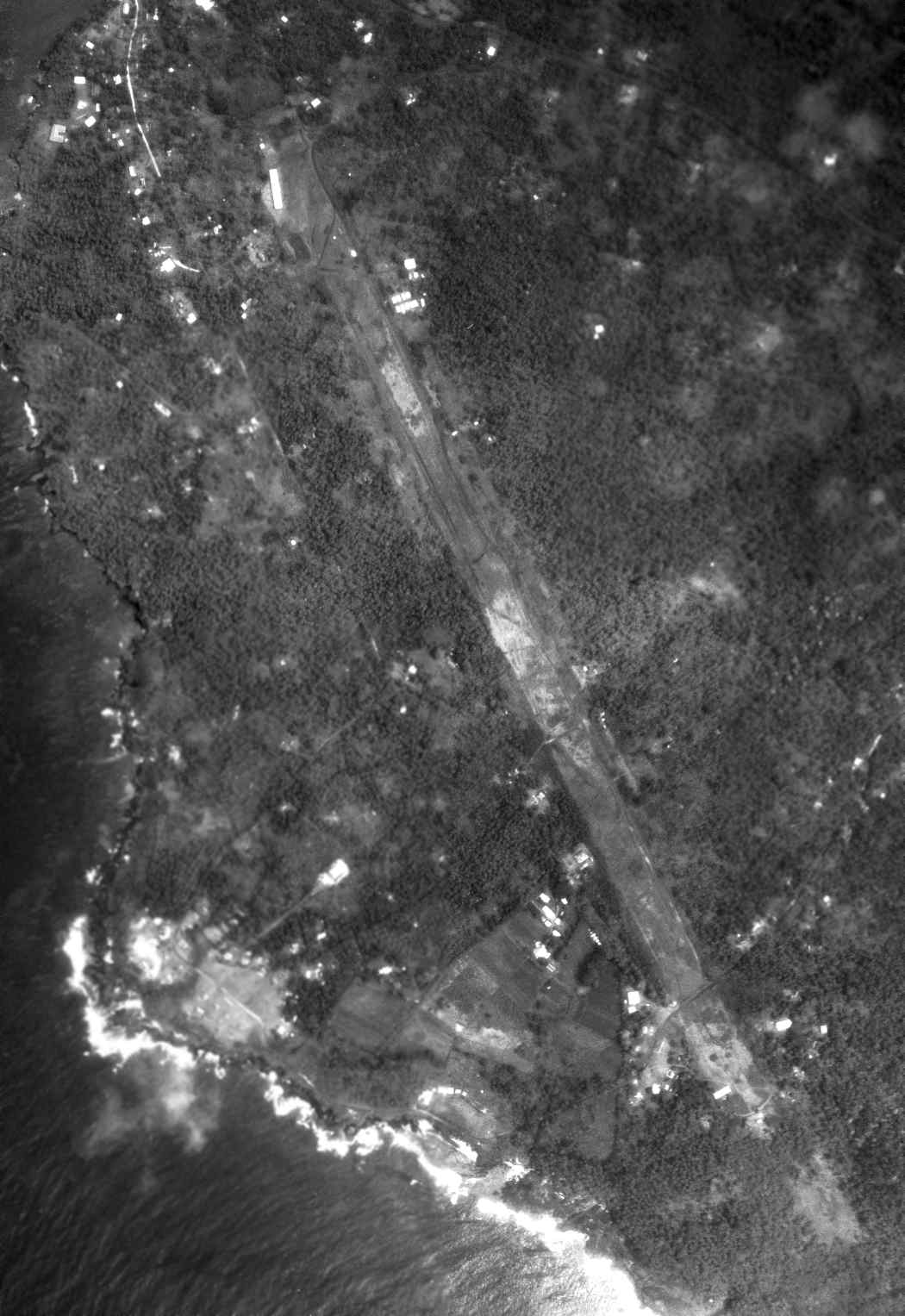
Leone Airfield

In the early 1900s, the Roman Catholics established the Marist Brothers School in Leone as a consequence of the unification of all Tutuila public schools. The Girls School at Leloaloa and the Boys School at Anua, Atu'u were also soon constructed. The all-girl secondary school was constructed by the London Missionary Society (LMS) on the edge of Afao, in Atauloma, which was completed by the year 1900. The building was situated on a 70 feet (21 m) by 116 feet (35 m) concrete slab which faced the sea. It functioned as an educational institution until the 1960s, and in the 1970s, it was leased to the ASG Government, which converted the building into apartments. It fell back in the hands of the LMS in 1995.

In 1902, Governor Uriel Sebree requested US$5,000 from the U.S. Navy to establish a public school system in American Samoa. When funds did not materialize, he arranged a government subsidy with the Roman Catholic mission to open a non-sectarian boys’ school near Leone, though he regarded reliance on religious bodies for schooling as undesirable.

In 1903, Fiji William of the schooner Mata’afa tested Pago Pago’s standing as the designated entry port for American Samoa by docking in Leone without proper authorization. His actions led to an arrest, a court conviction, and a $50 fine. The ship's owners, Grevhsmuhl and Company of Apia, protested this newfound enforcement — seeing it as an imposition on what had been a free port—and appealed to the U.S. Secretary of the Navy for repayment.

In 1905, the Marist Brothers began their mission in American Samoa, starting in the village of Leone, where they established a school.

In 1905, the villages of Leone and Pavaʻiaʻi were the first to complete properly protected water works. The transmission of filariasis was known to be mosquito-borne, but the mosquito was believed to pass it on to humans by contaminating drinking water. Doctors and biologists believed the answer to the problem laid in providing villages with pure water.

In the early 20th century, the Mau movement became intertwined with the Ripley family's commercial ambitions in Leone. In July 1920, Samuel Sailele Ripley returned to Leone from California for the first time since 1904 with plans to establish a copra plantation on his family's land. However, the Native Lands Ordinance of 1900 prohibited the sale of Samoan land, and the U.S. Navy held a monopoly on copra production in the area. Faced with these obstacles, Ripley aligned himself with the Mau movement and enlisted C.S. Hannum, his wife's former employer in California, to serve as the movement's legal advisor. Hannum initiated extensive correspondence between Samoa and Washington D.C., advising the Ripleys to challenge the legitimacy of the U.S. Navy's authority in Samoa by claiming it was unofficial, thereby rendering its laws and taxes invalid. The Ripley family sought a comprehensive congressional investigation to stop the U.S. government from exploiting the Samoan people. Samuel Ripley was actively involved with the Mau movement from July until November 1920, when Governor Waldo A. Evans deported him and his wife. A year later, Ripley attempted to return, arriving in Pago Pago, but Governor Evans intercepted him at the dock and deported him once more. Ripley was permanently barred from returning to Samoa and later became the mayor of Richmond, California.

In 1920, the roads were in such condition that a roundtrip from Leone to Pago Pago, a distance of around 16 miles (26 km), took an entire day. In 1922, the Leone Rapid Transit began operations, announcing two trips per day at a round trip fare of $2.00. It was a result of $30,000 earmarked for road construction by Governor Waldo A. Evans. A June 8, 1922 report states there was a bus service from Pago Pago to Utulei and from Utulei to Leone. The Leone Rapid Transportation also operated between Fagatogo and Leone. Road conditions were such that it took the whole day to cover the distance of 16 miles (26 km) between Leone and Fagatogo.

In June 1921, Sake, a resident of Leone, was shot and killed in a dispute over a gambling debt. The perpetrator, Toeupu of Vaitogi, became the first person in American Samoa to be sentenced to death by hanging. He was executed on July 1, 1921, less than a month after the crime.

From the 1920s until just after World War II, Leone became renowned for its siapo mamanu, a form of barkcloth art. At the center of this thriving tradition was a group of women siapo makers who not only supplied local demand but also produced vibrant, multi-colored pieces for export. Under the leadership of artist Kolone Fai’ivae Leoso, these women created thousands of siapo. Leoso's designs often drew inspiration from the stained glass windows of the Leone Congregational Church. During the late 1920s, they developed an economic connection with Mary J. Pritchard, the daughter of a Samoan mother and a white American father. Pritchard learned the art of siapo from the Leone women and became their link to broader markets, exporting products to traders in Honolulu, Hawai'i. This relationship contributed to Leone's growing reputation for siapo artistry. Leoso, a key figure in this artistic movement, continued to influence the style and production of siapo until her death in 1970.

In 1932, Leone was selected as one of four meeting places for the Bingham Commission of the U.S. Congress, which was sent to Pago Pago to study and report on complaints by Samoans against the Naval Administration. As a result of the commission's review, major changes were implemented by the Naval Administration for the betterment of both Tutuila Island and Manu'a. The Bingham Commission's hearings resulted in two major reforms: A Bill of Rights was created, and separation was established between the positions of Judge and Secretary of Native Affairs. The Bill of Rights was drafted by Governors Henry Francis Bryan and Edward Stanley Kellogg and Judge H.P. Wood. The Bingham Commission arrived in Leone on September 29, 1930, to hear witness testimony. During the visit, U.S. Senator Hiram Bingham gifted High Chief Tuitele a cane crafted from Hawaiian koa wood, fitted with a silver plate inscribed with his name.

In 1934, Annie Montague Alexander and Louise Kellogg visited Leone during their Pacific expedition. Leone served as their base for collecting specimens. The women spent a week in the forests near Leone, gathering a representative collection for the University of California Museum of Paleontology, which included doves, fruit pigeons, kingfishers, and fruit bats. They attended traditional Samoan festivities, such as siva dances and feasts. The hospitality extended to their accommodations as well, with the women retiring each night to a fale, a traditional guesthouse.

On September 30, 1943, a bomber airstrip known as Leone Airfield was completed in Leone. Today, the site is home to Leone High School and Midkiff Elementary School. The airfield was abandoned in early 1945 due to turbulent air currents and lack of use. The airstrip was meant to be a Marine Corps fighter strip, but only a total of two airplanes were able to land and take off before the strip was declared unsafe due to the turbulent air currents.

During his 1961-62 archaeological surveys in Leone, Dr. Yoshihiko Sinoto documented the first known pre-European petroglyphs in American Samoa (or in the Samoan Islands overall) at Leone Bay. Additional petroglyphs were discovered in 1966.

In October 1982, residents in Leone celebrated the 150th anniversary of the first missionary, John Williams. The Catholic Church in town celebrated the 100th anniversary of the Sisters School, which was established in Leone in 1883 by Sisters Mary St. Vincent, St. Claire, and St. Thérese.

=== Modern times ===
The highest-ranking Samoan military serviceman to lose his life in the War in Iraq, U.S. Marine Lt. Col. Max Galeai, was killed in Karmah, Iraq on June 26, 2008. He was from Leone and is buried in the village.

Leone had the most victims in American Samoa in the 2009 tsunami. A memorial garden - Leone Healing Garden - was created on the Sā Poloa family land, where most of the 11 victims were found. The garden commemorates the loss of the 2009 tsunami that killed 22 and injured hundreds of Leone residents. Located just offshore are remnants of a fishing ship that was damaged by Cyclone Gita in 2018.

In 2011, Leone Post Office was dedicated and replaced an older one destroyed by the 2009 tsunami.

In 2012, Samoa's Prime Minister Tuilaepa Sailele Malielegaoi suggested American Samoa construct a wharf at Leone Bay in order to reduce the travel time between Samoa and Tutuila. It is approximately 40 miles (64 km) between Upolu Island and Tutuila.

In December 2012, a police substation was dedicated in Leone. The new station was constructed with federal funds.

In 2013, Leone commemorated the fourth anniversary of the deadly 2009 tsunami that claimed nine lives in Leone, including two elementary school children. One hundred lanterns were floated at sea in their honor, and the victims were also remembered during church services.

In 2014, the Lepuapua Assembly of God Church in Leone marked its 50th anniversary in April. Several prominent guests attended, including Congresswoman Amata Coleman Radewagen, while a TV crew from KVZK-TV documented the service. The choir performed hymns with musical support from Poe Fagasa and others.

On November 1, 2014, a drive-by shooting took place in Leone. Several gunshots were fired at the front of the Leone Police Substation. No officers or other personnel were injured. Four bullets were later recovered from inside the station. Four men were charged for the shooting, which took place when two police officers were inside the station.

In 2019, the American Samoa Community College’s Agriculture, Community, and Natural Resources (ACNR) partnered with churches to clean up streams at Leone.

==== Tsunami ====
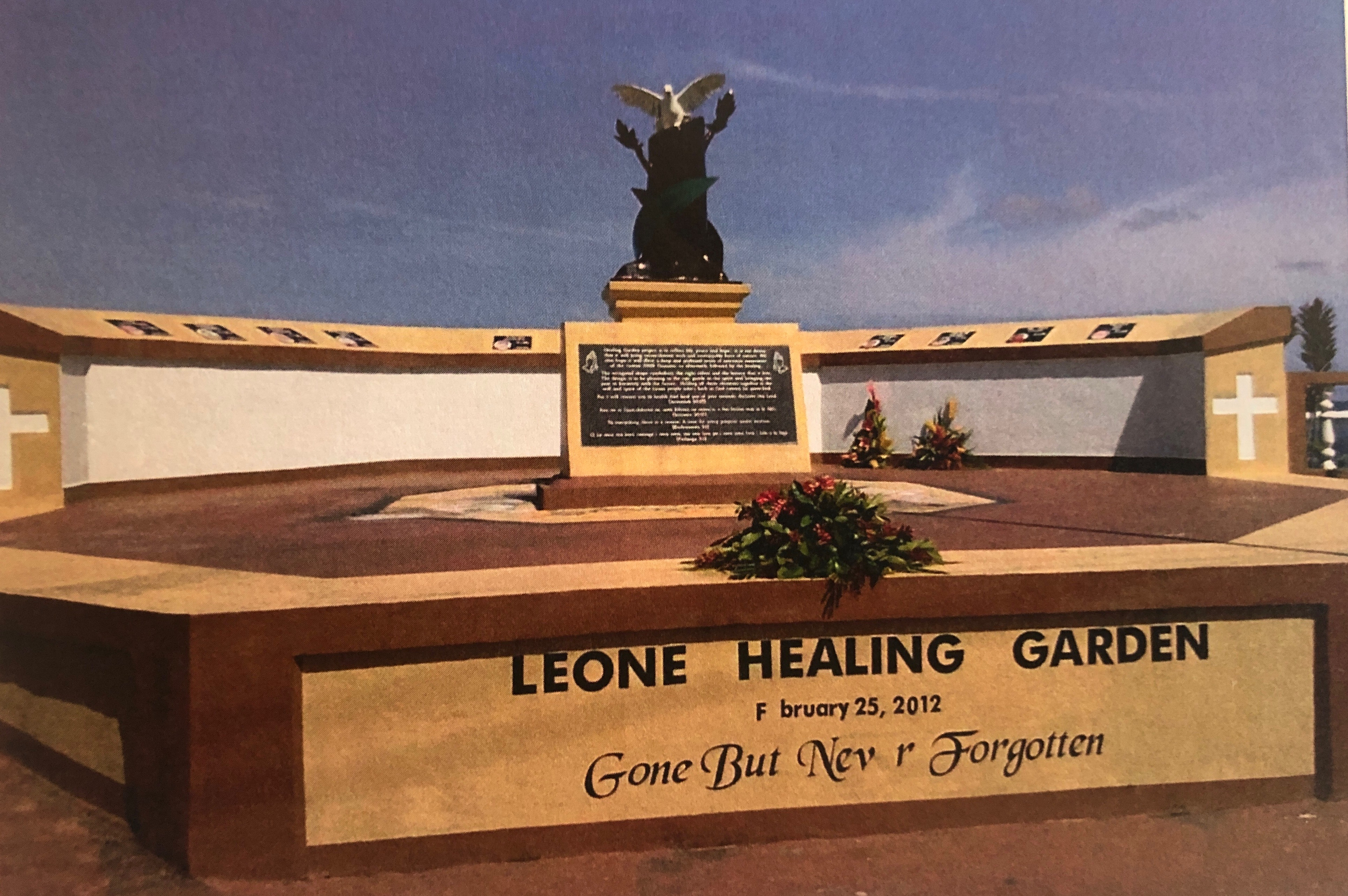
Leone Healing Garden

Leone was devastated by a tsunami on September 29, 2009. The tsunami was generated by a magnitude 8.0 undersea earthquake. Eleven people in Leone were killed by the tsunami. The victims were two children and nine adults, including elderly parents. The day of the tsunami is called the “Black Tuesday” and the village has erected a special monument known as Leone Healing Garden (Garden of Healing). The monument is near the seaside of the main road, and it was erected in order to commemorate the passing and to celebrate the lives of those who perished in the tsunami.

== Demographics ==
Year	Population
2020	1,598
2010	1,919
2000	3,568
1990	3,013
1980	1,652
1970	1,657
1960	1,192
1950	851
1940	711
1930	583

The population as of the 2010 U.S. census was 1,919, which was a significant decrease from 3,568 recorded at the 2000 U.S. census. The reason for this population decline was residents relocating to the United States for higher education and employment. Others have returned home to Western Samoa since the closing of Van Camp Tuna Industry in 1997.

The population of Leone went from 1,652 as of 1980 to 3,013 residents in 1990. This increase represented an annual growth rate of around 8.2%. The proportion of residents born outside American Samoa doubled from 1980 to 1990. The village was home to 443 housing units as of 1990. Construction permits were issued for 117 new homes between 1990 and 1995, increasing the number of total housing units to 560.

== Geography ==
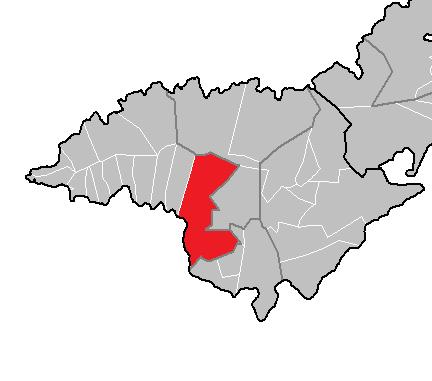
Map of western Tutuila where Leone is marked in red.

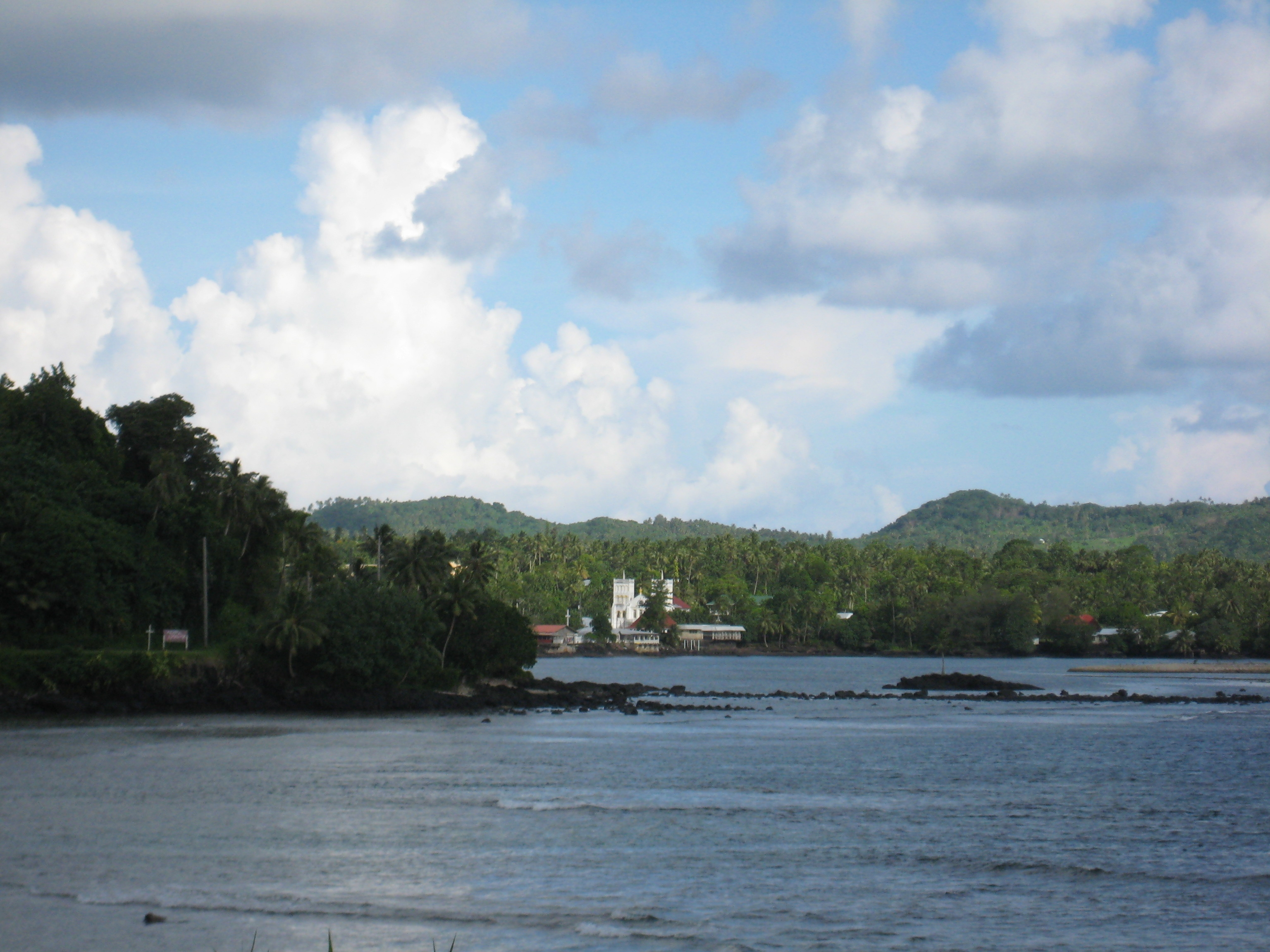
Leone is notable for its distinctive stone church, which serves as a prominent landmark in the area.

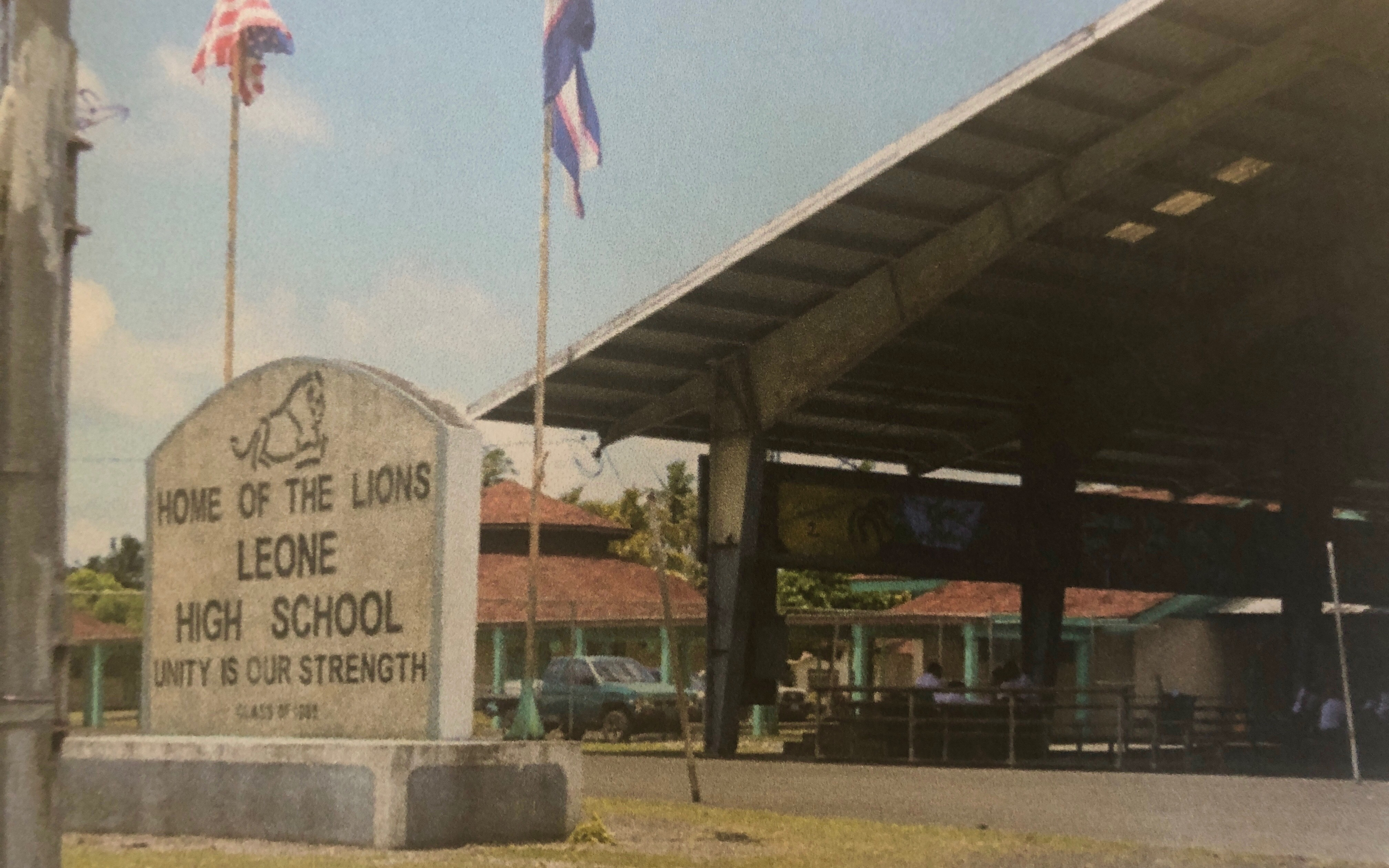
Leone High School

Leone is a village situated southwest on Tutuila Island in American Samoa, reached by Route 1 from Pago Pago. It borders the villages of Puapua and Vailoatai to the south, Malaeloa Aitulagi to the east, and Amaluia to the west. It lies at the foothills of Malaloto Ridge by Leone Bay. Leone Falls and Leone Quarry are inland following Leafu Stream from the coast. It is located in Lealataua County. The village is situated on Leone Bay and the village spreads across flat land on Leone Plain.

It is situated on the southwestern tip of Tutuila Island and is recognized as Fofō County due to its earlier connection to Samoan legends and historical events. It is 13 miles (21 km) west of Pago Pago. Niuavēvē Rock in Leone Bay is an islet with an old coconut tree, enduring natural disasters, generations after generations. Vailoa is located south of the village at Leone Bay, however, its coast consists of a low, rugged coastline, rather than sandy beaches as in Leone.

Pala Lagoon is a long stretch of swamp beginning from the main bridge on the road back to the foot of the mountains. The swamp has been a natural resource for marine life growth and is home to a number of bird species. Aualii Stream and Leafu Stream flow down from Mulimauga Ridge and through the village before discharging into Pala Lagoon. Leone has a large number of mangrove trees which have come back to normal after the destruction caused by the 2009 tsunami. The village is home to large parcels of fertile land used for farming and livestock. The soil is excellent for planting and growing yams of all kinds, bananas, talo, papayas, coconut trees for copra products, vegetables, and many other crops that are sold in grocery stores and at the Fagatogo Market. The coastline of Fagatele, an area in Leone, is made up of lava rocks, which were historically utilized to shape and grind stone tools.

=== Leone Pala Special Management Area ===
Leone Pala is a 21-acre mangrove swamp in Leone. It has been designated as a Special Management Area under the American Samoa Coastal Management Act of 1990. Special Management Areas are designated for their unique and irreplaceable habitats. The territory includes two such regions: Leone Pala Lagoon and Nuʻuuli Pala Lagoon. Since 1961, American Samoa has witnessed significant changes in its wetlands across different regions. Leone has seen its wetlands diminished by over half since 1961.

In 2013, American Samoa received a $269,000 National Coastal Wetland Conservation Grant. The grant will be used by the American Samoa Department of Commerce in order to restore 18.3 acres (7.4 ha) of coastal wetland habitat in Leone. The Leone wetland area is one of the largest and most important mangrove swamps in American Samoa and was designated as a Special Management Area in 1900.

Dominant vegetation in Leone's mangrove wetland includes the swamp fern, the oriental mangrove, red mangrove, and seashore paspalum.

=== Leone Falls ===
Leone Falls is a waterfall with a freshwater pool used for swimming. The waterfall is reached by following the road up past the grey Catholic church near the town center to the end of the pavement. Then follow the dirt path to the head of the valley, where the waterfall is located. An artificial catchment barrier is placed at the bottom, which creates a pool used for swimming. The waterfall is also enhanced by a water pipe on the side of the falls. The falls are closed on Sundays due to religious observances.

Barry's Bed & Breakfast is a motel in a quiet residential area of Leone near the waterfalls.

== Culture ==
=== Siapo ===
A distinctive exception to the generally widespread Samoan tapa motifs emerged in Leone during the 1920s. Under the guidance of Kolone Faiʻvae Leoso, a novel freehand-painted siapo style took shape, employing vibrant colors and frequently circular patterns. Many designs drew inspiration from the stained glass windows of the Leone Congregational Christian Church, while motifs were often named for the leaves of pandanus and breadfruit. Production ceased during World War II due to imposed restrictions. Although rare Leone-style siapo can still be found among families in Western Samoa, these examples appear to have had minimal impact on Western Samoan tapa practices. In the late 1920s, artist Mary J. Pritchard from Pago Pago received instruction from Leone artisans, later leveraging her teaching and entrepreneurial efforts to popularize Leone-style siapo. This approach ultimately evolved into the recognized tapa tradition of American Samoa.

In 1984, Mary J. Pritchard published Siapo: Barkcloth Art of Samoa and later showcased her siapo works through exhibitions in Honolulu, Tokyo, Auckland, and New York. She further launched an export venture, creating a commercial market in Hawaiʻi for Leone siapo.

== Petroglyphs ==
Leone is one of three places in American Samoa where prehistoric petroglyphs have been discovered. The petroglyphs were the first to be discovered in the territory when they were found during Dr. Yosihiko Sinoto’s archeological site surveys in 1961 and 1962. The petroglyphs include two representations of what is assumed to be two octopuses, fe'e. Another petroglyph is that of a turtle, laumei, while the fourth figure seems to represent a human figure. The petroglyphs are located in the Leone Lagoon on an intrusive shelf of ash called Papaloa. It consists of three shelves separated by two eroded channels of shallow water. The length of the shelf is around 150-200 feet.

The Leone Bay petroglyphs take the form of figurative engravings or rock carvings and have been engraved into the stone surface by pecking (hammering the stone with a sharp instrument), bruising (rubbing the surface with another stone), and abrading (a combination of bruising and pecking). In 1966, rock previously covered with algae was exposed and more petroglyphs were discovered. These took the shape of what appeared to be an octopus, a jellyfish, a turtle, and an incomplete human figure.

== Politics ==
Leone has been described as the “capital” of the Western District.

The village council banned the establishment of foreign-owned and operated businesses in 2002.

== Economy ==
As of 2000, there were 47 registered commercial enterprises in the village of Leone. They included 8 grocery stores, 7 bus- and taxi services, 7 retail stores, 5 wholesale operations, 3 professional services, 2 landscaping businesses, 2 bakeries, a cable service business, a janitorial service, a fast-food restaurant, a car repair, a pool hall, a laundromat, a gas station, a commercial diving contractor, a silk screen printing service, and a distributor of amusement machines. Commercial crop production and subsistence farming occur in the Leone watershed.

== Leone Quarry ==
The 50-acre (20 ha) Tatagamatau quarry above Leone is the largest in existence. It has been entered into the U.S. National Register of Historic Places. It is the most important archeological site in all of American Samoa. Various historical artifacts made of stone, some from as far away as Micronesia, have been discovered at this site. Archeologists Helen Leach and Dan Witter investigated the quarry in 1985. They discovered cutting tools, basalt adzes and pre-form tools. The quarry is also home to a star mound, similar to those found in the village of ‘Aoa. The basalt quarry in Leone can be visited. Although it is on community land, the hiking trail is owned by Tony Willis.

The Historic Preservation Office (HPO) did an investigation of the Tatagamatau adze quarry site in Leone, and revealed the site to be the oldest and largest of its kind in western Polynesia. It is also the only fortified adze quarry in the world.

== Historical sites ==
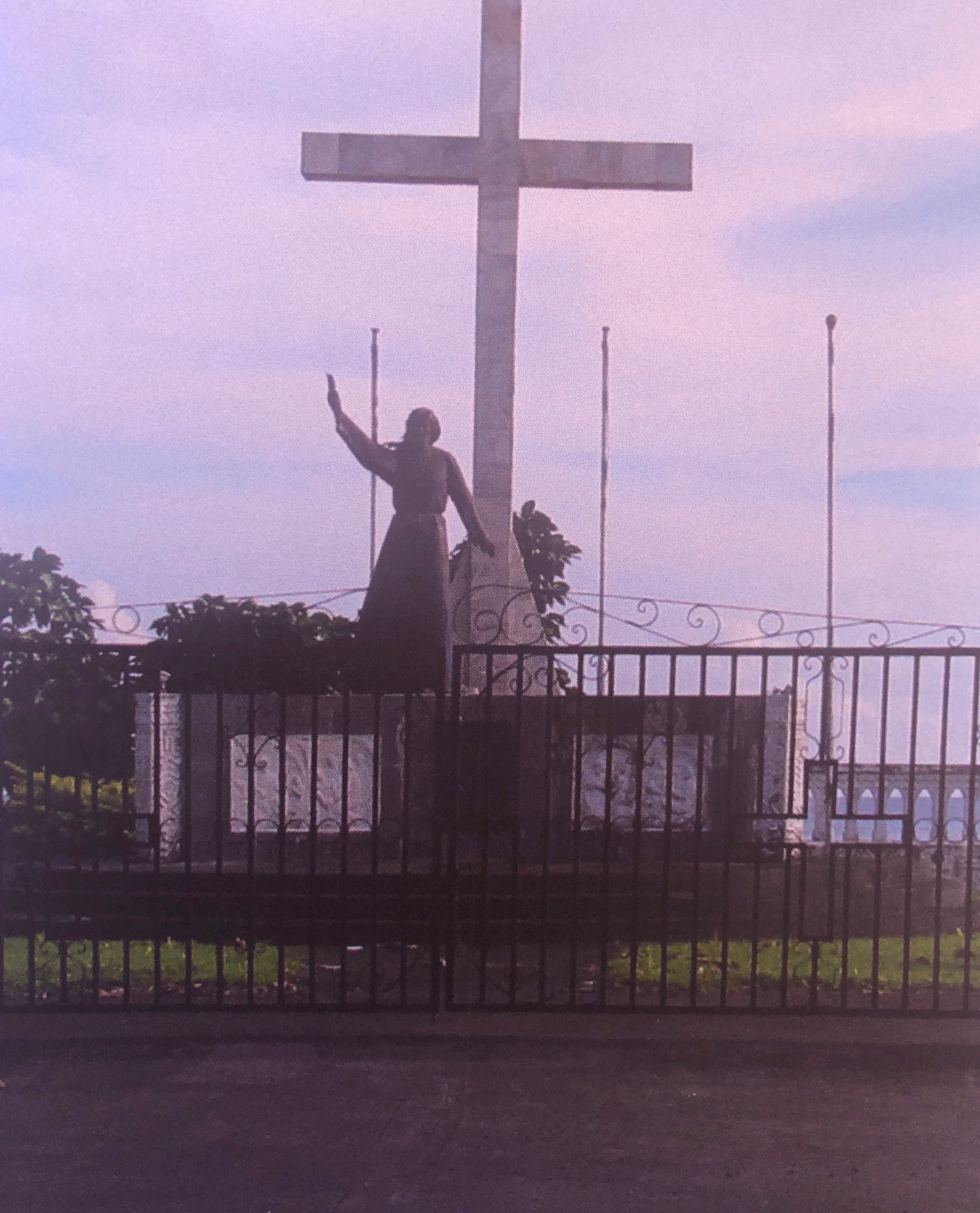
Monument by the sea in Leone

Historical sites in Leone include:

- Numiatoga (Fagatele), which is an area towards Leone's east coast. From this settlement of the 16th century Tongans, the warriors of Tutuila Island went to war with the Tongans under the leadership of Fuā'autoa, who later became known as Mauga. The Tongans were startled by the surprise attack, and they sailed away and promised to never to return to Tutuila as warriors, but rather as partners and peacemakers.
- Mauga o Alii (Mountain of Chiefs). In prehistoric times, villagers would hear loud ringing sounds from the middle of the tall mountains behind the village just before the death of a prominent chief. It was a premonition in the premodern days; according to some of the elders, the ringing sounds can still be heard today.
- A historic monument dedicated to Reverend John Williams is located in front of the Leone Congregational Christian Church (Siona).
- The Leone Quarry, listed on the U.S. National Register of Historic Places, is one of the earliest excavation sites on Tutuila Island and was occupied as early as 200 CE.
- Fagalele Boys School, listed on the U.S. National Register of Historic Places, was built in the mid-19th century and is the oldest European-style building on Tutuila Island.
- Siona Church, the oldest church in American Samoa.

A memorial woman sculpture is located by the sea and was placed there in order to signify the site where the first missionaries arrived in Leone.

== Sports ==
Leone's Moso’oi women's cricket team was the American Samoa national women's cricket champion for several years. The Leone Whites village rugby team has been the American Samoa Rugby Union's champion for a number of years. Leone teams have also participated in softball championship leagues and volleyball tournaments. Several residents of Leone have become football players in the National Football League (NFL), including Joe Salave'a, Gabe Reid, Eddie Siaumau, and Samoa Samoa.

Leone is the birthplace and hometown of Jaiyah Saelua, an American Samoan Soccer player who was the first transgender player to play in a FIFA World Cup qualifier.

== Landmarks ==
- Leone Quarry: Most important archeological site in American Samoa.
- Fagalele Boys School: May be the oldest building on Tutuila Island.
- John Williams' Church (Zion Church): Oldest church in American Samoa.
  - The church has a monument to John Williams, Samoa's first missionary.
- Leone Healing Garden
- Leone Falls

== Education ==
American Samoa Department of Education operates public schools, including Leone High School and Midkiff Elementary School.

== Notable people ==
- Samuel Sailele Ripley, leader of the Mau movement and later mayor of Richmond, California
- Jaiyah Saelua, first transgender player to play in a FIFA World Cup qualifier, born and raised in Leone
- Joe Salave'a, NFL player and football coach
- Tauese Sunia, former Governor of American Samoa
- Napoleon Andrew Tuiteleleapaga, author, poet and musician, composed the territorial anthem for American Samoa.
- Andra Samoa, chief executive and environmentalist
- Sika Anoa'i, professional wrestler.
- Jerome Kaino, rugby player
- John Kneubuhl, screenwriter, playwright and historian.
- Shalimar Seiuli, dancer, attended Leone High School
- Sven Ortquist, West Samoan artist, lived in Leone
- Solia Petero, member of the House of Representatives and Speaker of the American Samoa House of Representatives.
- Emanuela Betham, nun and teacher.
- Opa Iosefo Kapeli Iuli, member of the American Samoa House of Representatives and ASG Budget Director.
- Pula Nikolao I. Tuiteleleapaga, member of the American Samoa House of Representatives and the first Samoan Director of Education.
- Jane Tuuinatu Pritchard, first woman postmaster of American Samoa.
- Dan Taulapapa McMullin, artist
- Ned Eric Ripley, professor and Queen's Service Medal recipient.
- Afa Ripley Jr., former Attorney General of American Samoa
- Mary Jewett Pritchard, Siapo artist, lived at Leone.
