= Congregational LMS Samoan Church =

The Reformed Congregational LMS Samoan Church
- Ekalesia LMS Toefuata'ina Samoa
- Location: Samoa, New Zealand, Australia, United States of America
- Language: Samoan
- Denomination: Christian
- Tradition: Calvinist
- Religious institute: Reformed; Congregationalism

History
- Founded: 1992
- Founder: The Late Reverend Tepa Faleto'ese

Administration
- District: Samoa, New Zealand, Australia, United States of America

The Reformed Congregational LMS Samoan Church (Samoan: Ekalesia LMS Toefuata'ina Samoa) is a global Christian Denomination based in Samoa, Australia, New Zealand and the United States of America. It traces its origins to Protestant and Congregationalist doctrines, while its core is firmly grounded in the Samoan language, culture, and tradition (Fa'a Samoa). The motto of the Church is Fa'afaigofie, Fa'ataugofie, Fa'asa'oloto (Worship God freely, at ease, in simplicity).

The Church is sometimes referred to as the Lotu Toefuata'ina, Lotu Faleto'ese or the Lotu LMS Fou.

The Church emerged as a breakaway denomination from the Congregational Christian Church of Samoa (EFKS). Originating from the London Missionary Society (LMS), which introduced Christianity to Samoa in 1830, the EFKS Church was formerly known as the LMS Samoan Church until 1962. The Reformed Congregational LMS Samoan Church has retained the original name LMS. By retaining the name of the London Missionary Society (L.M.S.), despite the society's inactive status, the church pays homage to the missionaries who first arrived in Samoa, thus emphasizing the significance of its foundational heritage. Embracing a Reformed Congregationalist and Calvinist perspective, it not only upholds traditional values but also contributes to the ongoing narrative and evolution of its community and faith in God.

== History ==
The Reformed Congregational LMS Samoan Church (Ekalesia LMS Toefuata'ina Samoa) was founded by the late Rev. Elder Tepa Faleto'ese in Balmain, Sydney, Australia, in 1992.

=== Tepa Faleto'ese (founder) ===
Faleto'ese, a distinguished Elder Pastor within the Congregational Christian Church of Samoa and a member of the Committee of Elders (Komiti o le 'Au Toea'iina), had a long-standing commitment to the EFKS church. Over the years, he served in various capacities within the EFKS, including as Pastor for EFKS Fagaloa (1955), Director of Boys Brigade (1959), Pastor for EFKS Christchurch (1975), and EFKS Aolo'au, before relocating to Australia in 1980.

In 1985, Faleto'ese initiated the establishment of the first EFKS congregation in Australia, originally situated in Balmain and later renamed Rooty Hill. As an Elder, he advocated within the Committee of Elders for reforms aimed at prioritizing the spiritual growth of church members over purely physical aspects. Faleto'ese's perspectives, although influential, encountered resistance from the majority of the Committee of Elders. After many attempts to initiate reforms within the EFKS Church, Faleto'ese resigned from the Church upon retirement to establish a new and more contemporary church that catered to the spiritual needs Samoan Christians, particularly those migrating from Samoa overseas. The mission was to set a denomination that focused on three main principles: Fa'afaigofie, Fa'ataugofie, Fa'asa'oloto (Worship God freely, at ease, in simplicity) .

=== Establishment of the church ===
By 1990, Faleto'ese's perspectives and proposals for reform sparked curiosity and interest among some Samoan EFKS members residing in Sydney, Australia. They too sought change, recognizing the challenges of sustaining the financial obligations of the EFKS Church in their adopted homeland. Many among them were Scholarship Students from Samoa studying in Australia.

In 1992, Faleto'ese established the Reformed Congregational LMS Samoan Church in Balmain, Sydney Australia. Initially comprising only three families, the congregation experienced rapid growth, expanding to 30 families by the close of 1993.

Faleto'ese remained dedicated to its growth and ensuring the new Church adequately served Samoan immigrants.

In 1993, alongside the late Reverend Siataga Tuiataga (a Pastor of the EFKS Church), they founded the inaugural first New Zealand Parish in Christchurch. By 1996, a Parish was established in Brisbane, Australia and entered into a covenant with the late Reverend Alapati Tu'uga, a Lay Preacher of the EFKS Church (and Father to the famous Samoan Band, Fetulima/The Five Stars), as their Pastor. That same year, Faleto'ese initiated the establishment of the first Auckland, New Zealand Parish in Glen Eden with the assistance of the late Reverend Litaea So'oa'emalelagi, a Pastor and graduate of the EFKS Malua Theological College, who assumed the role of Parish Pastor. In 1997, Faleto'ese established the first United States of America Parish in Salt Lake City, Utah and the Parish covenanted with their Pastor, the late Reverend Manusina Taulagi.

=== Name ===
Faleto'ese initially named the denomination 'The Independent Samoan Congregational Church' (Ekalesia Fa'apotopotoga Samoa Tuto'atasi). In 1996, the General Assembly made the decision to rename it the Reformed Congregational LMS Samoan Church (Ekalesia LMS Toefuata'ina Samoa) as a tribute to the London Missionary Society, which introduced Christianity to Samoa in 1830 and its new reform.

Effectively, the church experienced exponential growth, solidifying its position as a pivotal Church for Samoans within Australia, New Zealand and the United States. By the turn of the millennium in 2000, the church had expanded to 24 congregations, with 10,000 individuals baptized and confirmed as devout members of the Reformed Congregational LMS Samoan Church.

== Structure, belief, focus ==
The Reformed Congregational LMS Samoan Church is a Protestant denomination with Congregational roots, adhering to the belief in God the Father, God the Son, and God the Holy Spirit. The church's core beliefs revolve around Jesus Christ, recognized as the Head of the Church.

The core purpose and focus of the Church is to offer a traditional space for Samoans to worship God freely, with ease, and in simplicity (Fa'afaigofie, Fa'ataugofie, Fa'asa'oloto). The Church endeavours to provide extensive support to its members in all aspects of life, aiding them in nurturing their spiritual connection with God. It integrates Samoan culture and language seamlessly with their Christian faith, fostering a holistic experience of worship and community.

The Church firmly ascertains the Apostle's Creed as its foundation:

"I believe in God, the Father almighty, creator of heaven and earth. I believe in Jesus Christ, his only Son, our Lord, who was conceived by the Holy Spirit and born of the virgin Mary. He suffered under Pontius Pilate, was crucified, died, and was buried; he descended to hell. The third day he rose again from the dead. He ascended to heaven and is seated at the right hand of God the Father almighty. From there he will come to judge the living and the dead. I believe in the Holy Spirit, the Holy Church, the communion of saints, the forgiveness of sins, the resurrection of the body, and the life everlasting. Amen."

== Governance ==
The Church maintains that Jesus Christ is the Head of the Church.

The Church operates under the governance of the General Assembly (Fono Tele), which comprises all parish members. Pastors are elected to hold offices responsible for governing the Church. The General Assembly convenes annually, consisting of elected representatives from each parish, as well as all Pastors and their wives. The Committee of Elders (Komiti o Au Toea'i'ina) oversee the General Assembly and handles matters concerning Pastors and the Clergy.

The Church operates with a District System, wherein each country serves as a District (Matagaluega), further subdivided into Sub-Districts (Pulega), overseen by Elder Pastors (Toea'ina). Each sub-district encompasses a cluster of parishes under its leadership and guidance.

The Women's Fellowship (Mafutaga a Tina) holds significant importance within the Church, playing a pivotal role in its operations. Responsible for addressing women-specific issues and overseeing the day-to-day maintenance of church property, they operate as a behind-the-scenes society, supporting the church in managing its affairs.

Within the Parishes, the Church comprises five primary subgroups: Ekalesia (Church), Mafutaga a Tina (Women's Fellowship), Aoga Aso Sa (Sunday School), Autalavou (Youth), and Aufaipese (Choir). These groups collaborate to provide support and upkeep for the Parishes.

=== Pastors and ordination ===
Initially, the eligibility to become a Pastor was restricted to those who underwent training at the EFKS-affiliated Malua Theological College in Samoa. However, as the number of congregations increased and the scarcity of Malua-trained pastors willing to serve the Reformed Congregation LMS Samoan Church, the General Assembly in 1996 opted to broaden the criteria. They resolved to ordain any lay preacher (A'oa'o Fesoasoani) or student from any credible Theological College, provided they complete a one year internship with a selected Parish. Transferral Pastors (Pastors who are currently in ministry with another Denomination) are also accepted. Pastors are required to undergo police vetting and background checks in accordance with the laws of each respective country.

Pastors are elected to serve a parish for a lifetime, unless they opt for retirement or the parish decides to terminate their covenant (Tatala le Feagaiga) with the Pastor. The Parish retains the authority to dissolve the covenant at any time and select a new Pastor to assume the role.

Today, the predominant cohort among ordained Pastors consists of individuals who have served as lay preachers within the Church for many years.

== The church today ==
The Reformed Congregational LMS Samoan Church stands as a prominent denomination with a presence in Samoa, Australia, New Zealand, and the United States today.

The Church has experienced division over time, leading to the formation of additional denominations and the resignation of parishes, pastors, and members from the original Church Faleto'ese established. Despite these challenges, those who remain steadfast in their commitment to the LMS Toefuata'ina Church continue to serve God diligently within its folds.

Today, the Church operates six active Parishes spanning Samoa, New Zealand, Australia, and the United States with around 500 active members. Two additional parishes operate independently from the General Assembly, overseeing their own affairs while upholding a strong connection with the Church. They retain the name of the Church, solidifying their association with the broader denomination.

Reverend Apolimatai Tautaiolevao holds the position of Chairperson (Ta'ita'ifono) currently within the Reformed Congregational LMS Samoan Church.

== Denominations formed from the Reformed Congregational LMS Samoan Church ==
=== Reformed Congregational LMS Samoan Church in New Zealand (Ekalesia LMS Toefuata'ina Samoa i Niu Sila) ===
In 2001, the late Reverend Litaea So'oa'emalelagi and the New Zealand District of the Reformed Congregational LMS Samoan Church sought independence from the main Church as part of a schism. Despite securing a majority vote at the General Assembly (Fono Tele) in 2001, So'oa'emalelagi's role as Chairperson (Ta'ita'ifono) was not implemented by the Church which led to dissatisfaction within New Zealand's 14 Parishes and Pastors, prompting them to form an Independent Church in New Zealand.

That same year, the LMS Toefuata'ina Samoa i Niu Sila was established, with the Auckland Sub-District (Pulega Aukilani) under So'oa'emalelagi and the Christchurch Sub-District (Pulega Kalaisetete) under the late Reverend Siataga Tuiataga. However, a year later, 10 of the 14 pastors and parishes decided to reunite with Faleto'ese's Church. They elected Reverend Solomona Iosefa, who was the Pastor of the second Auckland branch in Glen Innes, as New Zealand's District Elder upon its return.

Currently, the church operates with three active Pastors and Parishes in Auckland and has rekindled its relationship with the main church. It has around 100 active members.

=== The Pacific LMS Samoan Church (Ekalesia LMS Pasefika Samoa) ===
In 2007, the Pacific LMS Samoan Church was established by the late Reverend Alapati Tu'uga and 14 Pastors and Parishes from the main church, stemming from a schism driven by reformations. Disagreements over the church's Constitution with other governing members prompted Tu'uga and his supporters to depart and establish the new denomination.

Presently, the church has restored its ties with the Reformed Congregational LMS Samoan Church and operates 20 active parishes across Samoa, Australia and New Zealand with around 8,000 active members.

=== The First Revival Samoan Church (Ulua'i Ekalesia Fa'afouina Samoa) ===
In 2013, the Reformed Congregational LMS Samoan Church sought membership with the Council of Churches in Samoa. However, they were membership was denied with the reason that they were using the name 'LMS', a copyright of the Congregational Christian Church of Samoa. The Council of Churches recommended that they remove the 'LMS' from their name to be accepted.

During the General Meeting, the matter was deliberated, and a resolution was proposed: those who wished to comply with the Council of Churches' recommendation could do so but would lose their membership in the Reformed Congregational LMS Samoan Church.

Under the leadership of the late Reverend Manusina Taulagi, five Pastors and Parishes opted to leave and establish The First Revival Samoan Church in 2014. Today, the church comprises five active parishes with approximately 150 members across the United States, Samoa, and Australia.
