= Congregational Christian Church in American Samoa =

Christian denomination in American Samoa

Congregational Christian Church of American Samoa
- Ekalesia Fa'apotopotoga Kerisiano i Amerika Samoa
- Orientation: Calvinist
- Polity: Congregational
- Associations: World Communion of Reformed Churches, Pacific Conference of Churches, World Council of Churches, Congregational Christian Church of Samoa
- Region: American Samoa, Australia, New Zealand, United States
- Origin: 1980; American Samoa
- Separated from: Congregational Christian Church of Samoa
- Merger of: United Church of Christ (UCC), USA
- Congregations: 113, and 380 house fellowships
- Members: 20,000+
- Official website: efkas.org

The Congregational Christian Church of American Samoa - CCCAS (Samoan: Ekalesia Faapotopotoga Kerisiano i Amerika Samoa - EFKAS) is a theologically Calvinist and Congregational denomination in American Samoa.

The Congregational Christian Church of American Samoa (CCCAS) follows the 'congregationalist' model of church organization, which entails two fundamental principles meticulously upheld within the CCCAS structure. Each member of the congregation retains independence and autonomy in decision-making on its own local church matters.

The CCCAS is a Christian denomination deeply rooted in Samoan culture and language which was evident in its worship practices and community service endeavors.

== History ==
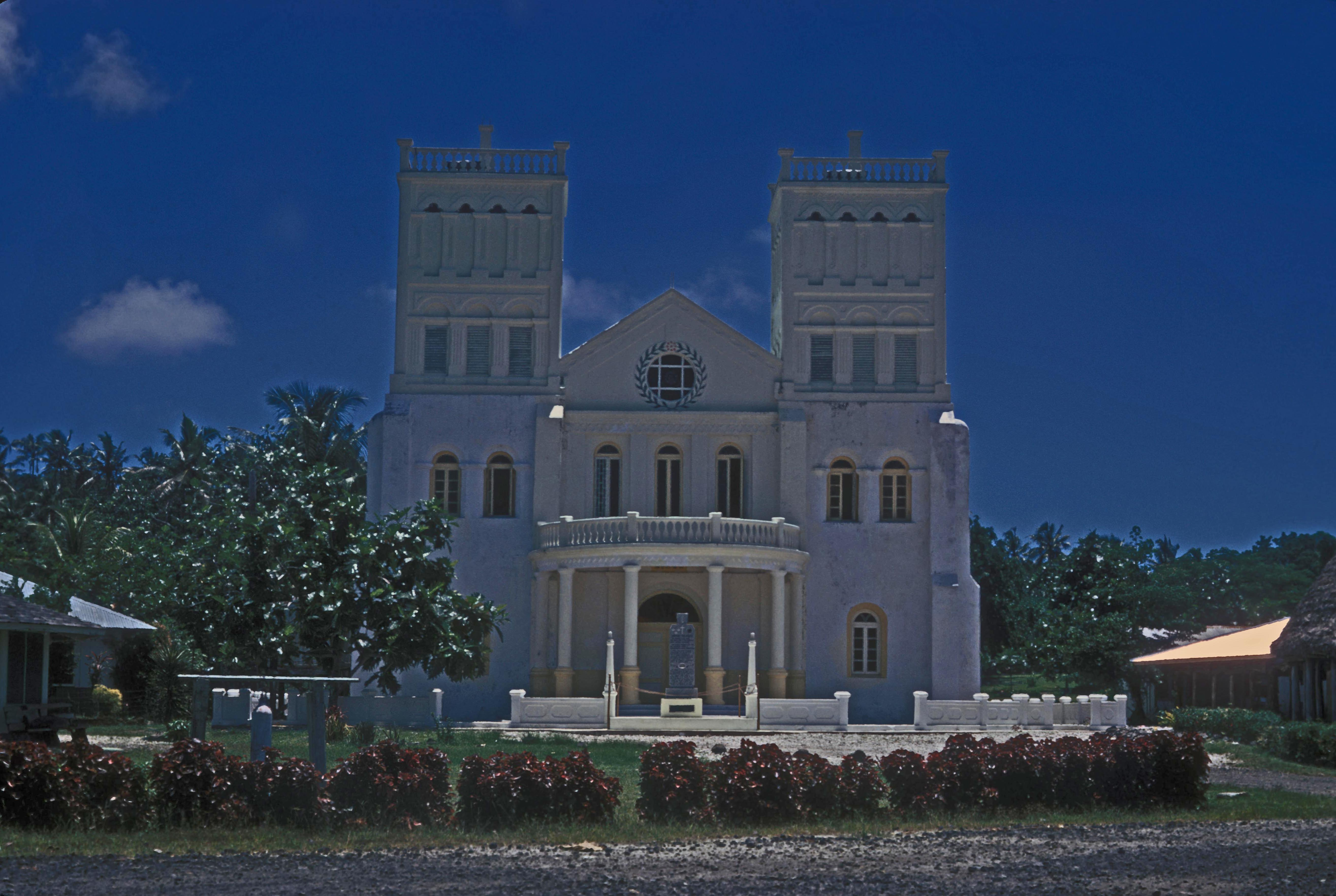
Zion Church in Leone, founded by the London Missionary Society

In 1830, Reverend John Williams and the London Missionary Society, introduced Christianity to Samoa. The ruler of Samoa at the time, Malietoa Vainu'upo, warmly welcomed this new faith, leading to its rapid establishment and spread across the islands. Upon learning of this development, Tui Manu'a, the sovereign of American Samoa (Kingdom of Tutuila and Manu'a), also embraced Christianity. Subsequently, the Church swiftly expanded throughout American Samoa, with the entire Kingdom converting to the faith. This pivotal moment solidified American Samoa as a stronghold of the LMS Mission.

The congregations in American Samoa were under the jurisdiction of the LMS Head Office in Malua, Samoa. In a significant development in 1962, the LMS Samoan Church, referred to as the Lotu Ta'iti in Samoa (Tahitian Church), officially adopted its new name: Congregational Christian Church of Samoa (EFKS). By then, the EFKS Church was fully established in Samoa, American Samoa, Hawai'i, New Zealand and the United States.

At that time, American Samoa had evolved into a naval dependency with the United States, transitioning in 1950 to an American dependent civil territory. As the political landscape shifted, the congregations in American Samoa, mindful of the changing dynamics within the American Samoa Government, sought independency from the EFKS Church headquartered in Malua, Samoa.

In 1980, with the support of the Congregational Christian Church of Samoa - EFKS, the congregations in American Samoa became independent, officially adopting the name Congregational Christian Church of American Samoa (CCCAS/EFKAS). This move reflected a desire to realign with the evolving governance structures and societal shifts in their homeland.

== Church Mission ==
The Great Commission, as presented in the Gospel of Matthew, remains central to the Church mission. However, as articulated in the Church Constitution (6th revision, 2010), the mission of the Congregational Christian Church of American Samoa (CCCAS) also encompasses, but is not confined to, the following theological imperatives:

- further the cause of Jesus Christ in the world by revealing to humanity the glorious redemptive power of God that is manifested in the Resurrected Christ must be shown in their words and lives;
- To faithfully represent God in our testimony and service towards humanity and all of creation;
- To worship God in truth and Spirit and to lead others to do the same;
- To work wholeheartedly for the welfare of others to bring out justice and peace, and to encourage them to live Christ-like lives so they too may be redeemed and enjoy the blessings of salvation received through Jesus Christ;
- To inspire in all persons a love for Christ, a passion for righteousness, and a consciousness of their duties to God and their fellow human beings;
- To collaboratively join with fellow Christians in charitable work and render assistance to the downcast, the poor, the weak, sick and neglected;
- To bear witness to the love of God, so that all of humanity and creation may share in the benefits and blessings that God's love provides in abundance.

== Church Structure ==
The General Assembly (Fono Tele) serves as the paramount decision-making body for the entire church organization. These core characteristics underscore the CCCAS's commitment to congregational autonomy and collective decision-making at the highest level. The Committee of Elders (Komiti o Au Toea'i'ina) oversee the General Assembly and the affairs relating to the Church.

The CCCAS General Assembly meets biannually in July at its headquarters in Kanana Fou, American Samoa. Delegates from all member congregations convene to discuss and deliberate matters related to the Church's mission and ministry. Following the Assembly, elections are held for Church Officers, who oversee the implementation of Assembly resolutions and manage daily operations from the Central Office in Kanana Fou.

Each member congregation of the CCCAS is represented in Committees and Fellowships through their affiliation with a Region (Matagaluega) and District (Pulega). The CCCAS is composed of a total of 10 Regions and 25 Districts. Membership in a Region and District ensures representation of each congregation in various Committees and Fellowships dedicated to advancing the church's mission and ministry.

== Kanana Fou Theological Seminary ==
Upon gaining independence in 1980, the CCCAS embarked on establishing its own Theological Seminary distinct from the Malua Theological College of the CCCS/EFKS in Samoa.

In 1983, this came into fruition when the CCCAS established the Kanana Fou Theological Seminary to train individuals for the ministry within the Congregational Christian Church of American Samoa - CCCAS. Today, Kanana Fou Theological Seminary serves as a vital training ground for Samoan clergy, extending its reach to train individuals from neighboring Pacific nations such as Tuvalu, Niue, and Nauru.

== The Church Today ==
The Congregational Christian Church in American Samoa (CCCAS) comprises a total of 113 member congregations spread across various locations including American Samoa, the United States, New Zealand, and Australia.

These congregations are organized into 10 Regions (Matagaluega), divided into 25 Districts (Pulega), each led by an Elder Minister (Faifeau Toeaina). Among these districts, 11 are situated in American Samoa, 2 in Hawaii, 9 on the West Coast of the United States ranging from Alaska to Southern California and Arizona, while 2 are located in New Zealand, and 1 district in Australia.

The Headquarters for the CCCAS is in Kanana Fou, Pago Pago, American Samoa. The CCCAS works unanimously with the United Church of Christ to provide adequate support to its member congregations in Hawai'i and the United States.

Today, there are over 20,000 adherents of the Congregational Christian Church of American Samoa.

== Interchurch organisations ==
A member of the World Communion of Reformed Churches, the World Council of Churches, Pacific Conference of Churches and maintains partnership with the United Church of Christ and the Congregational Christian Church in Samoa.

The denominational headquarters located in Pago Pago.
