= Leone Healing Garden =

Memorial in American Samoa

Coordinates: 14°20′17″S 170°47′13.3″W

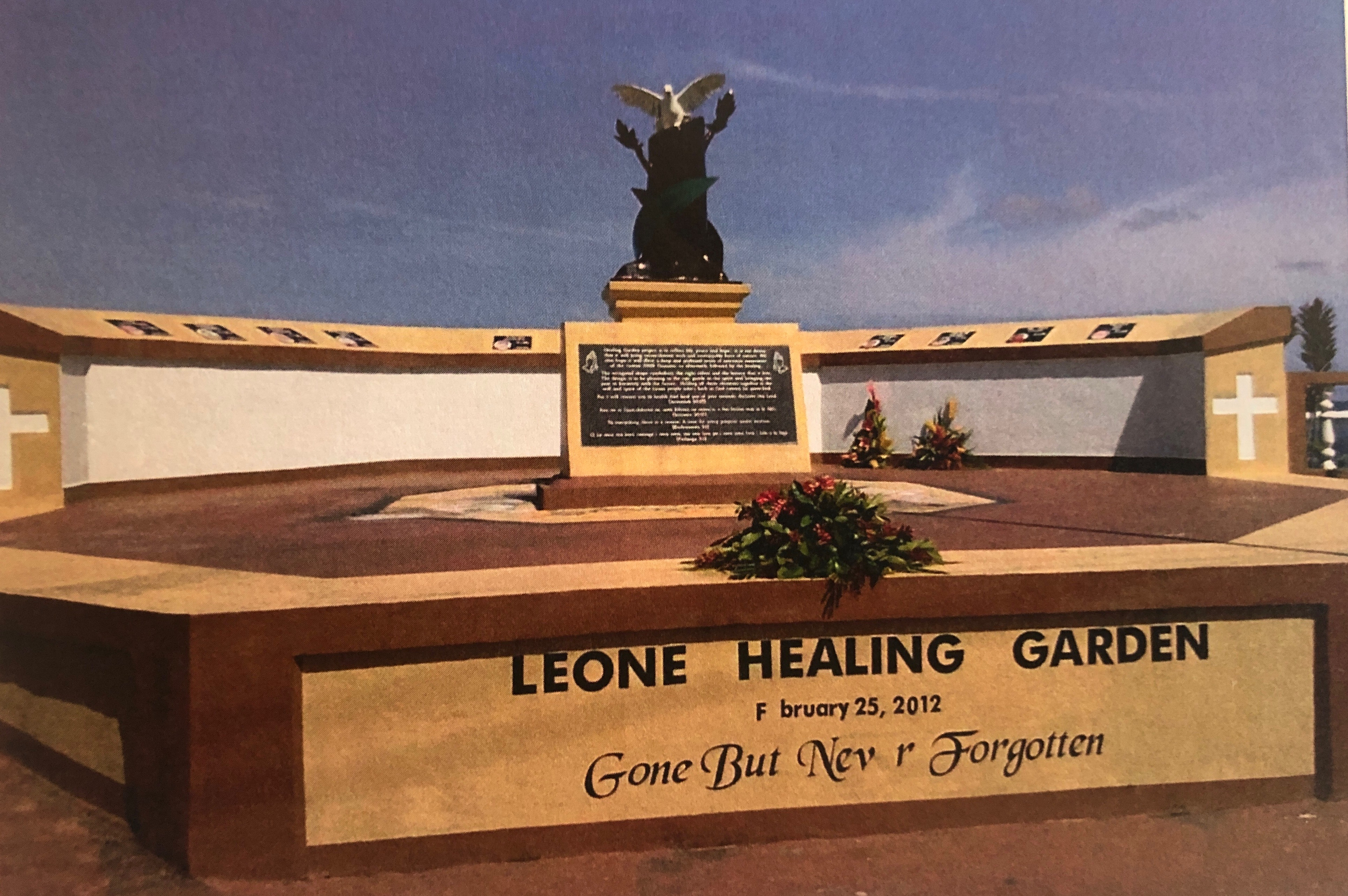

The Leone Healing Garden (or Garden of Healing) is a garden memorial in Leone dedicated to those who lost their lives in the 2009 tsunami. The Healing Garden is meant to allow families of the victims of the tsunami to have a place "where they can grieve and celebrate life at the same time". The first chair of the garden was Ipu Avegalio Lefiti and the project manager is Makerita Enesi. The garden contains plants, a sculpture made by Patrick Mafo'e, and plaques with the names of the 11 people who died in the tsunami.

The Healing Garden was begun in 2010 and was built on a site where much of the damage caused by the tsunami occurred. Some of the original funding came from the Nuanua Recovery Project. The garden was opened in 2012. In 2013, the garden received 30 plants in celebration of Earth Day. It continues to host memorial services for victims of the tsunami.
