= Tataga-Matau Fortified Quarry Complex =

- Tataga-Matau Fortified Quarry Complex (AS-34-10)
- U.S. National Register of Historic Places
- Nearest city: Leone, American Samoa
- Area: 24 acres (9.7 ha)
- NRHP reference No.: 87001957
- Added to NRHP: November 19, 1987

The Tataga-Matau Fortified Quarry Complex, designated Site AS-34-10, is a major archaeological complex on Tutuila, the largest island of American Samoa. Located in an upland area on the western side of the island above the village of Leone, the complex consists of a series of basalt quarries and structures that archaeologists have interpreted as having a military defensive purpose. The site has been known since at least 1927, and was first formally surveyed in the 1960s. Features of the site include extraction pits, from which basalt was quarried for the manufacture of stone tools and weapons, as well as domestic features such as grinding stones. Archaeologists in 1985 noted that some of the features of the site were, including trenches and terracing, were made in areas that were unsuitable for the production of stone tools, and closely resemble known military defensive structures in other areas of the Samoan islands. The site extends along with a network of ridges for more than 1.4 kilometres (0.87 mi). Radiocarbon dating of elements of the site indicate periods of occupation and/or use from c. 200 CE to the period of European contact.

The site was listed on the National Register of Historic Places in 1987.

== See also ==
- National Register of Historic Places listings in American Samoa
