= Mary Jewett Pritchard =

American Samoan textile artist

- Born: Mary Rose Jewett; September 17, 1905; Pago Pago
- Died: June 6, 1992; Pago Pago
- Education: Catholic Sisters School, Mid-Pacific Institute
- Occupation: Textile artist (1929–)

Mary Jewett Pritchard, 1944

Mary Jewett Pritchard (September 17, 1905 – June 6, 1992) was an American Samoan textile artist. Pritchard is widely credited with reviving the art of siapo, the Samoan version of tapa, handmade cloth created by pounding the bark of plants.

== Early life ==
Mary Rose Jewett was born September 17, 1905, in Pago Pago on the island of Tutuila in American Samoa. Her parents were Felesita Fuga, member of well-known Pago Pago families, and Joseph Jewett, an American construction worker hired to build the main deck in Pago Pago Harbor. Mary attended Catholic Sisters School in Atu'u through the fifth grade, the highest level offered to girls at the time. In 1919 she left home to attend Kawaiahaʻo Seminary for Girls in Honolulu.

Mary's father died when she was eighteen years old, shortly after she had finished her studies at the Kawaiahaʻo Seminary. She decided to stay in Samoa to support her family, taking a job doing clerical work for the government. She resigned from the Public Works Department in 1927, after marrying and becoming pregnant with her first child.

== Promoting and creating siapo ==
Pritchard grew up surrounded by the practice of creating siapo, which was used as clothing, bedding, and in ceremonies, but her active interest in siapo began when she was a young woman. She married Ron Pritchard, from the village of Leone, in 1925. Mary and her husband spent time regularly in Leone, where she watched the women make siapo mamanu, a freehand decoration of siapo cloth.

In 1927 Pritchard began a business exporting siapo from other artists to the overseas market, along with other materials such as floor mats and hula skirts. This provided artists with a way to support their families and continue to make traditional crafts. She began learning the craft of creating and decorating siapo mamanu from the artists of Leone in 1929, especially her mentors Tui‘uli Leoso and Kolone Fai‘ivae Leoso. With the outbreak of World War II, export was cut off and the making of siapo was curtailed. After the war, it became impossible for Samoan women to make a living from making traditional handicrafts. Both the cultivation of u‘a (the paper mulberry plant used to create the cloth) and the making of siapo cloth declined through the 1950s and 1960.

Pritchard began a campaign to save this traditional craft. She continued making siapo mamanu and taught the art to visitors and local schoolchildren. In 1971 she was featured on the PBS program "Artists in America." This exposure led to increased requests to make personal appearances describing the importance of siapo and demonstrating its creation; she traveled widely throughout the Pacific, Asia, and North America sharing her expertise. The South Pacific Commission began marketing siapo in their handicraft catalogues.

Siapo : bark cloth art of Samoa was written by Pritchard and published in 1984 by the American Samoa Council on Arts, Culture and the Humanities; the book shows the processes and products of siapo.

== Death and legacy ==
Pritchard died in Pago Pago on June 6, 1992.

Governor of American Samoa Peter Tali Coleman described the importance of Pritchard's work:

"Mary's living experience and extensive expertise in siapo-making, gained under personal tutelage of past masters of this native art, are examples of how Samoans gain knowledge and build character. Her drive and dedication in revitalizing siapo-making among our Samoan young people is born of her fierce pride in her Samoan heritage."

A show honoring Pritchard was held at the Jean P. Haydon Museum in 1991. Examples of her siapo are located in the Bishop Museum and the Denver Art Museum.
