= Fagalele Boys School =

Historic building in American Samoa

- U.S. National Register of Historic Places
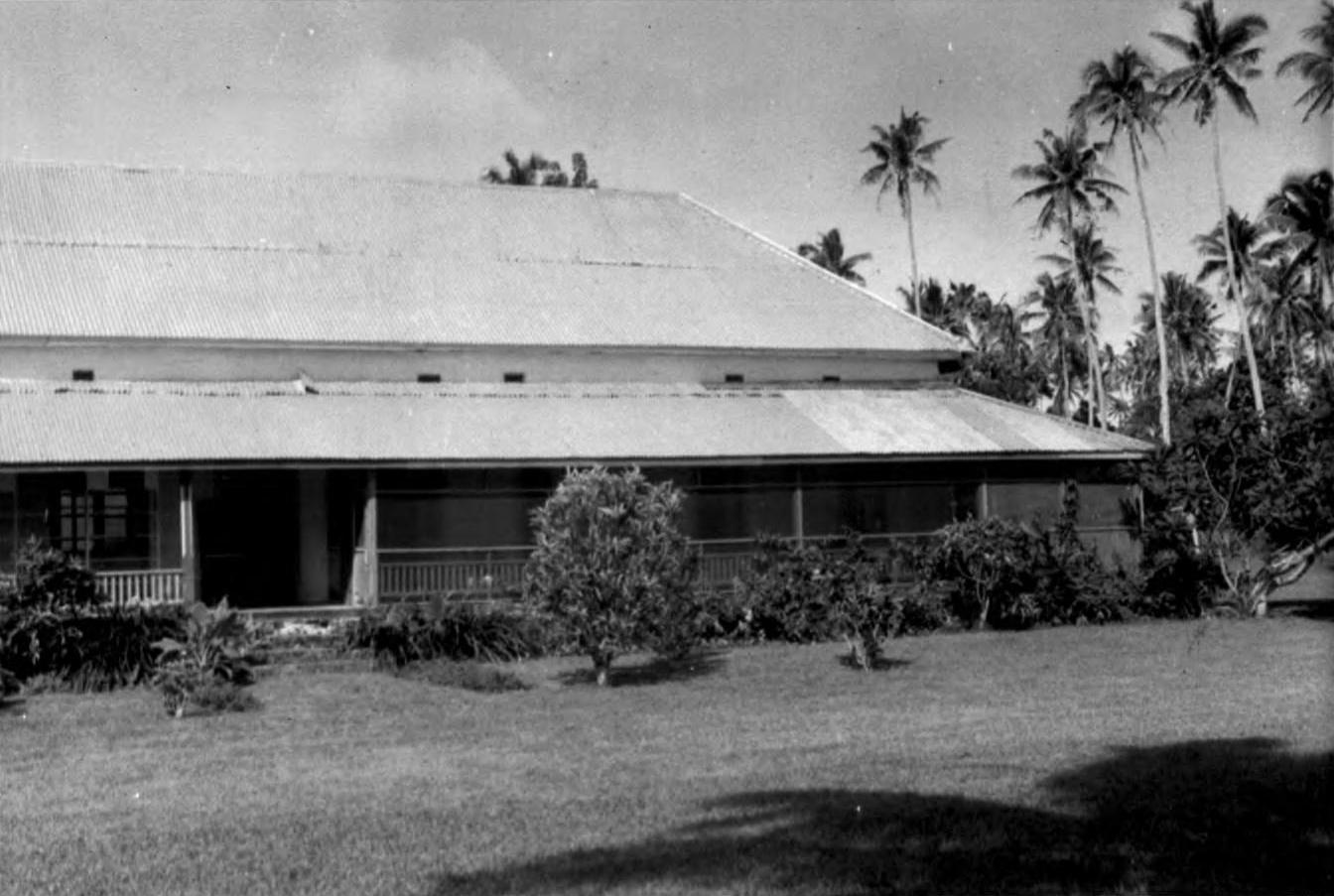
- 1971 photo

- Location within American Samoa
- Nearest city: Leone, American Samoa
- Coordinates: 14°20′31″S 170°47′10″W
- Area: 2 acres (0.81 ha)
- NRHP reference No.: 72001446
- Added to NRHP: March 16, 1972

The Fagalele Boys School, in Leone, American Samoa, is a historic building that was listed on the U.S. National Register of Historic Places in 1972. It is a church school built by the London Missionary Society, perhaps as early as 1850–1856, but before 1900. It was the first secondary school in what is now American Samoa, and it perhaps is the oldest surviving building on Tutuila Island.

== Design ==
It is a U-shaped building fitting within an 80-by-60-foot (24 m × 18 m) rectangle, apparently built of reinforced concrete or of rocks with a cement-plaster exterior.

== History ==
The LMS Fagatele Boys School was built in 1855, the same year that the Samoan version of the Old Testament was printed for the first time. Originally, it consisted of schoolrooms and living quarters for the pastor. It was here that students were trained for entry to the LMS Seminary in Western Samoa. It is possibly the oldest building in American Samoa. It is the oldest European-style building on Tutuila Island.

Fagalele was the London Missionary Society's district secondary school for what is now American Samoa, serving selected village-school graduates from Tutuila and Manua, and it was the only one until 1900. Boys attended for two or three years before entering the seminary at Malua. In 1926 it was the only one of the Society's district secondary schools that taught English. Pupils likely lived in thatched Samoan houses beside the building and grew food on farmland they worked themselves.

The school was closed during the Navy's 1926 census and is believed to have reopened later, but its final closing date is unknown. The walls are about two feet thick, and the original roof was probably thatch, replaced by corrugated iron by 1900. By 1970 the building was a residence for a National Council of Churches missionary working mainly with non-Samoan residents of Tutuila, with an apartment for visiting church officials. It was owned by the Congregational Christian Church of Samoa.

== See also ==
- National Register of Historic Places listings in American Samoa
