= Zion Church (Leone) =

Church in American Samoa

Coordinates: 14°20′25″S 170°47′06″W

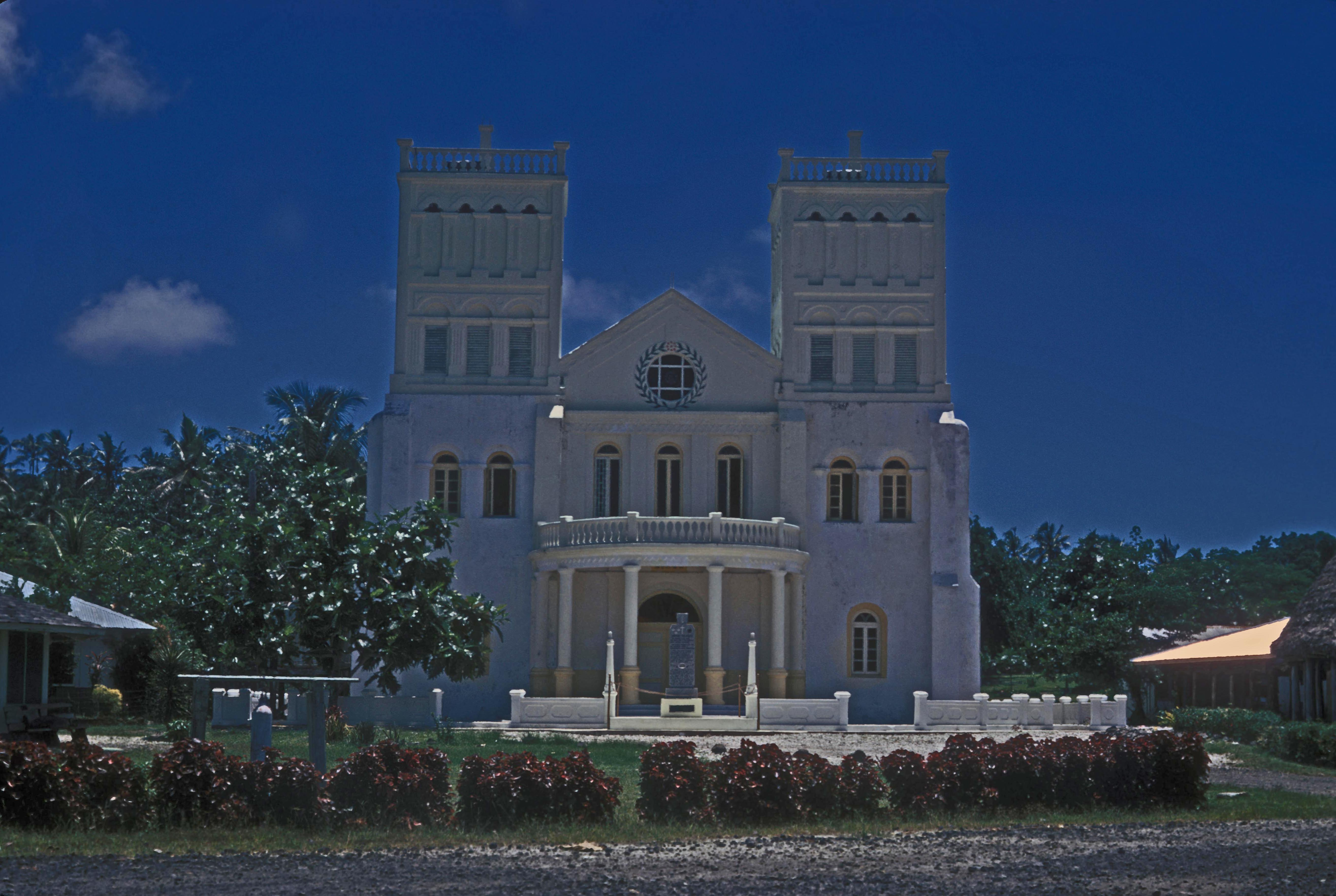

Zion Church in Leone is the oldest church in American Samoa. Outside the church there is a monument to John Williams, the Samoan Islands' first missionary. The church is also known as Leone Congregational Christian Church, Siona Chapel, John Williams' Church, and Siona Church. In Samoan language, the church is known as Siona le Mauga Pa’ia, Malumalu o Siona, or simply Siona.

Zion Church was built in 1900 by the London Missionary Society (LMS). It was built to commemorate John Williams' landing in 1832 and stands on the site of the original church — the first church established in what is now American Samoa. The original church, which was the first on Tutuila Island, was erected by missionary John Williams. Zion Church is now affiliated with the Congregational Christian Church in American Samoa (CCCAS). It is adorned with three towers, stained-glass windows, and a finely carved, ornate wooden ceiling.

It has been renovated three times, including over a two-year period in the early 1990s. In May 2013, a team of specialists from Hawai'i, led by Dr. Francine Palama of Maunakai & Associates Architecture-Planning-Historic Preservation, traveled to Leone to evaluate the church. As one of the oldest church structures in the Samoan Islands, dating back to around 1900, the congregation hoped for recommendations favoring renovation over demolition. After a thorough inspection, the team determined that the historic building was sound and could remain standing for another century. Subsequently, a new church hall, with a cost exceeding $200,000, was dedicated in early 2014.
