= Messenger of Peace (missionary ship) =

Ship built in 1827 by John Williams

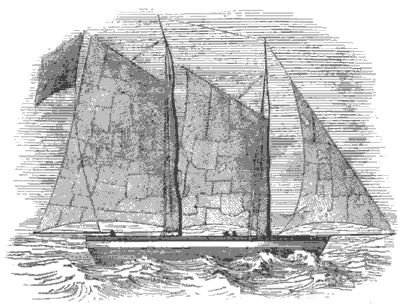
- Messenger of Peace, as she appeared when leaving Rarotonga for Tahiti, with her mat-sails, &c.

History
- Name: Messenger of Peace
- Builder: John Williams, Avarua, Rarotonga
- Launched: 1827
- Fate: Sold 1836

General characteristics
- Tons burthen: 70 (bm)
- Length: 60 ft (18 m)
- Sail plan: Schooner

Messenger of Peace was a missionary ship built in 1827 in Avarua, Rarotonga, by John Williams to spread Christianity to Samoa and the Society Islands on behalf of the London Missionary Society (LMS). He spread his ministry, sailing her from 1827 to 1836 under a flag of a white dove on a blue background while subsidising his efforts by trading between the islands.

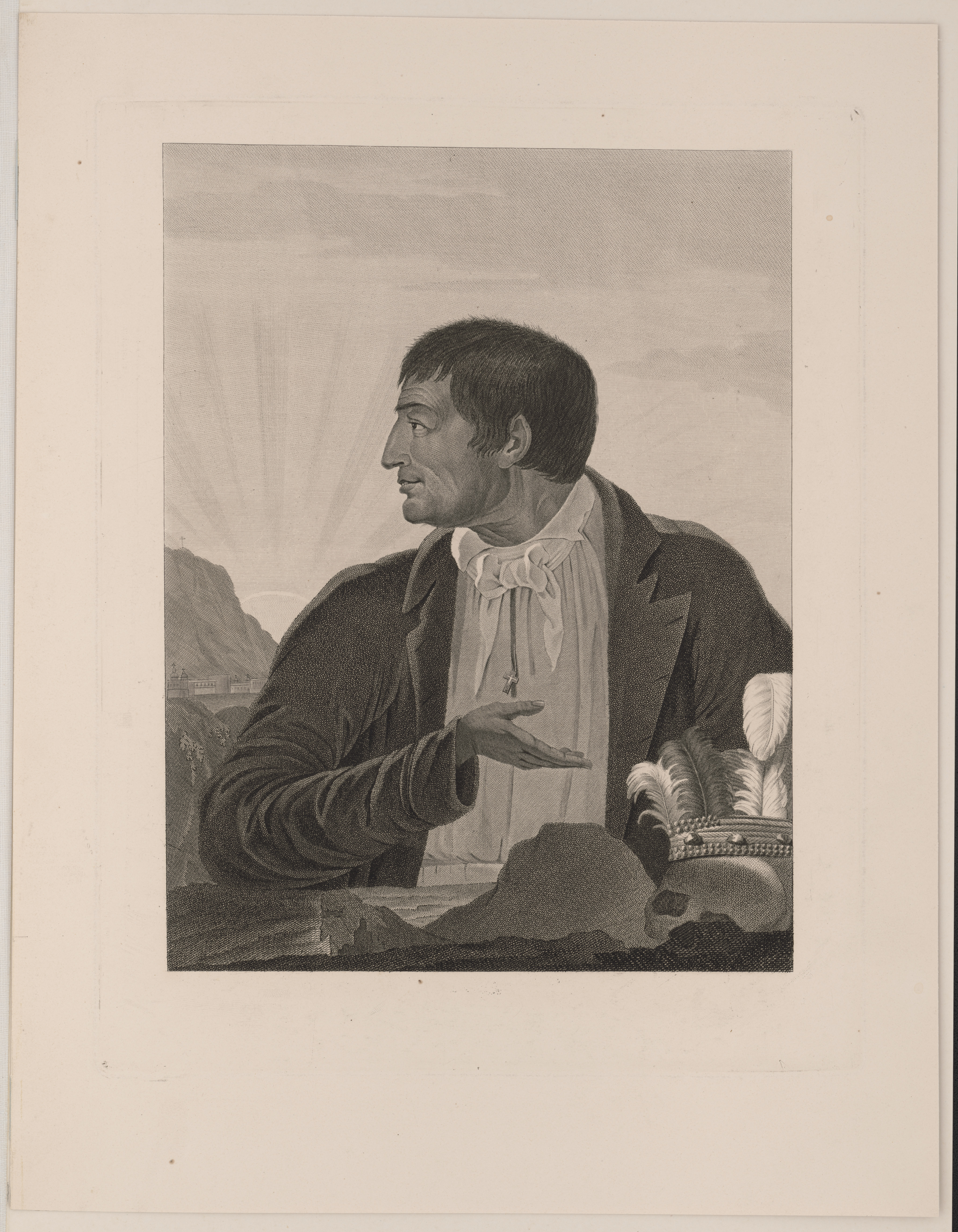
John Williams around the time he built the Messenger of Peace

Williams had earlier purchased Endeavour in 1821, meaning to supply missionaries in the islands "with the necessities of civilized life, including clothing, flour, tea, and sugar" and fund the operation by trade. However the LMS objected to such a strategy and had him sell the ship by 1827. Williams' presence in the South Seas, Tahiti, and Rarotonga spanned 1817 to 1839. He arrived in Rarotonga in 1827 and learnt of other islands in the vicinity where the inhabitants practised paganism. (He described them as "heathens".) To reach them, he built Messenger of Peace from local materials in fifteen weeks and then set sail for the Society Islands.

== Construction of the ship ==
The ship, a 70-ton fore-and-aft schooner 60 feet (18 m) in length, was built from a local mahogany called tamanu (Calophyllum inophyllum). The wood was not ideal for ship construction, and her masts were neither straight nor smooth. Also on hand was some scrapped ship's main cable, which he converted into iron bolting, using a stone anvil and charcoal instead of coal. They made the rudder fastenings from a piece of a pickaxe, a cooper's adze, and a large hoe. Ropes were made of fibres from hibiscus trees. He made her sails from matting. It took fifteen weeks to build, using no proper tools and no special knowledge in shipbuilding. What little knowledge he had had come from 1816 in Eimeo, the Society Islands, when he had found an incomplete ship used by earlier missionaries, which he repaired and made seaworthy, whereupon he christened her Haweis. This small but useful vessel was later given to a local chieftain as a matter of diplomacy. Williams had some help from fellow missionary Aaron Buzacott, and a reduced local workforce of former cannibals, as the majority of islanders were busy building housing elsewhere on the island. Over time some of this crude equipment was replaced by gifts from passing naval officers.

== Voyages ==
Once the ship was complete, and using verbal directions given to him (as was the custom) by the locals, he set sail and visited Aitutaki, Manuae, Mauke, Atiu, and Mangaia before returning to Rarotonga. A second voyage was taken to islands in the west. He returned in February 1828 and then removed his family to Raiatea. In mid 1830, the ship visited Samoa, where they were well received by the "heathens".

== Hurricane damage and repairs ==
The ship was repaired twice in Rarotonga on returns from the Friendly Islands. The first time, during 1832, Rarotonga had been hit by a particularly powerful hurricane, which greatly damaged the island's housing and pushed the ship onto the island, knocking branches off trees some twelve to fifteen feet (3.7 to 4.6 m) off the ground. She came to rest in a four-foot (1.2 m) hole she had made for herself. As Williams said later, "She had sustained no injury whatever". 2000 natives hauled her out and put her back into the sea. This delayed Williams' plans to visit Samoa for some months as all the parts of the ship, the store, masts, rigging, blocks, pitch, and copper were strewn over a wide area and had to be collected for the repair. They set sail on 11 October. The voyage was to last fifteen weeks, four of which were spent in the Samoan group. Then on her return journey to Rarotonga she sprung a leak 300 miles (480 km) from the Friendly Islands. The ship was half full of water, nearly four feet (1.2 m) deep in her hold. Strenuous efforts at baling her out over several days kept her afloat for landing at Vavau for repair. However the leak could not be found, and she made for another island in the group, where she sought help from two ships at anchor. With the help of their crews, Messenger of Peace was hove down, and the leak discovered—an augur hole missing its bolt had been filled with mud and stones from the hurricane earlier on Rarotonga. A stone had wedged itself sufficiently to have kept the hull from leaking for six months and several thousand miles on the sea. She returned to Rarotonga for extensive repairs in January 1833.

This last experience, coupled with a need for the Williams family to return to England, convinced Williams that, despite several arduous voyages over six years, she was not fit for purpose and in need of replacement, so she was sent to Tahiti and sold in 1836.

== Legacy ==
The story of the Messenger of Peace had made Williams famous. On his return to England he set about raising funds for the purchase of a replacement. In 1838 the London Missionary Society purchased the brig Camden, of 192 or 194 tons (bm), built in 1809 at Falmouth as a Falmouth packet. Camden sailed from London on 11 April 1838 and returned the Williams and eight other missionary families for duty in Africa, India, the Pacific Islands, and China, before returning to Williams for permanent station.

Over the years seven LMS ships named John Williams carried on the work from 1844 to the last, John Williams VII, which was decommissioned in 1968.

== Gallery ==
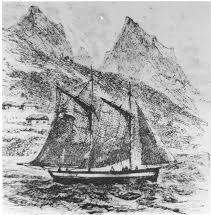
Messenger of Peace with sails made of matting

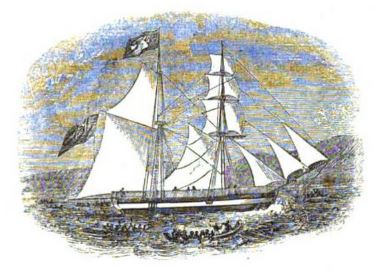
Messenger of Peace off the Samoas with new sails

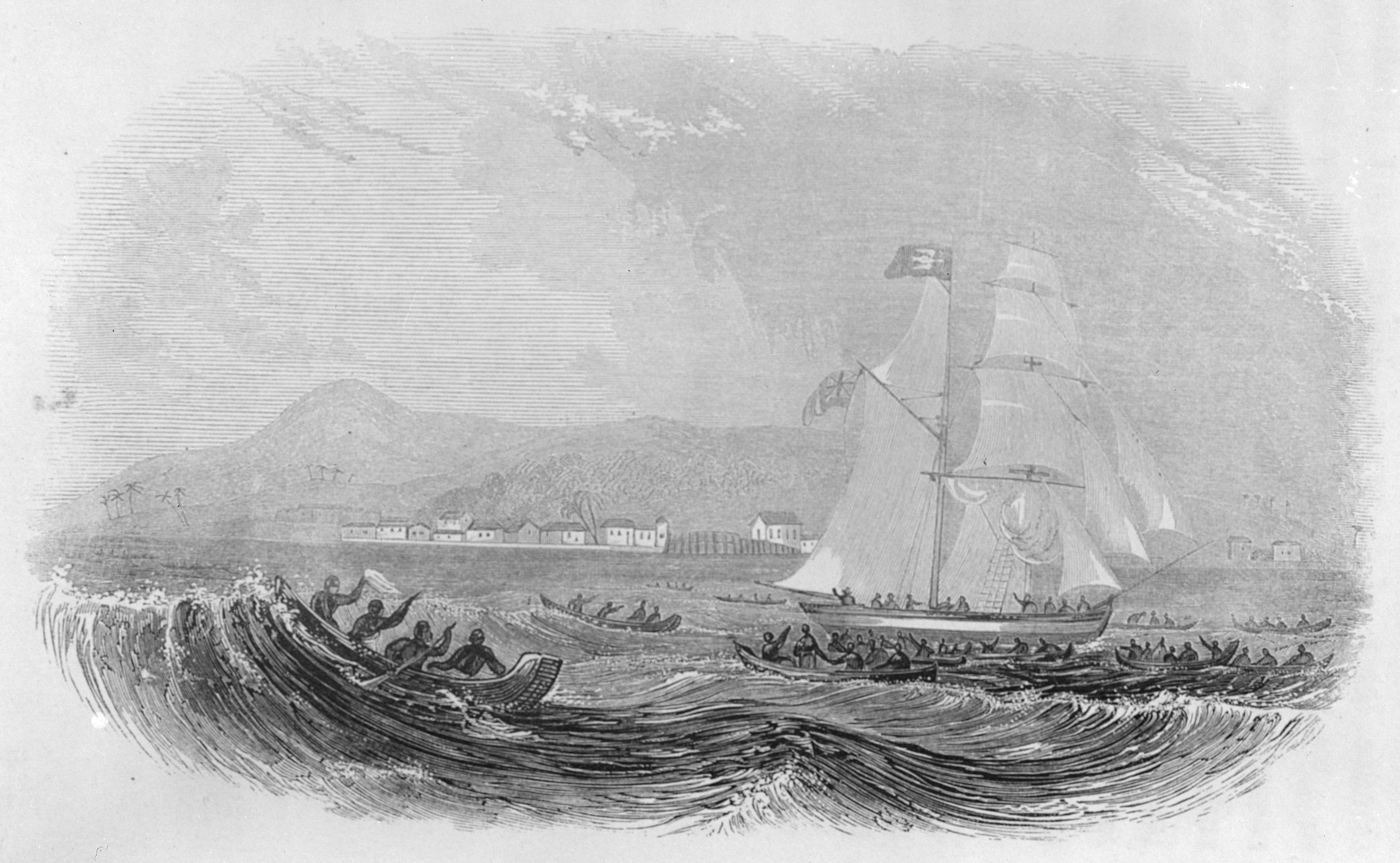
Leaving Aitutaki, note Dove of Peace flag

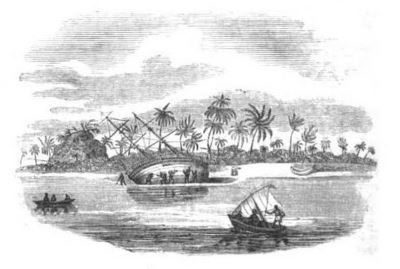
Messenger of Peace hove down at Vavau, Samoa for repairs

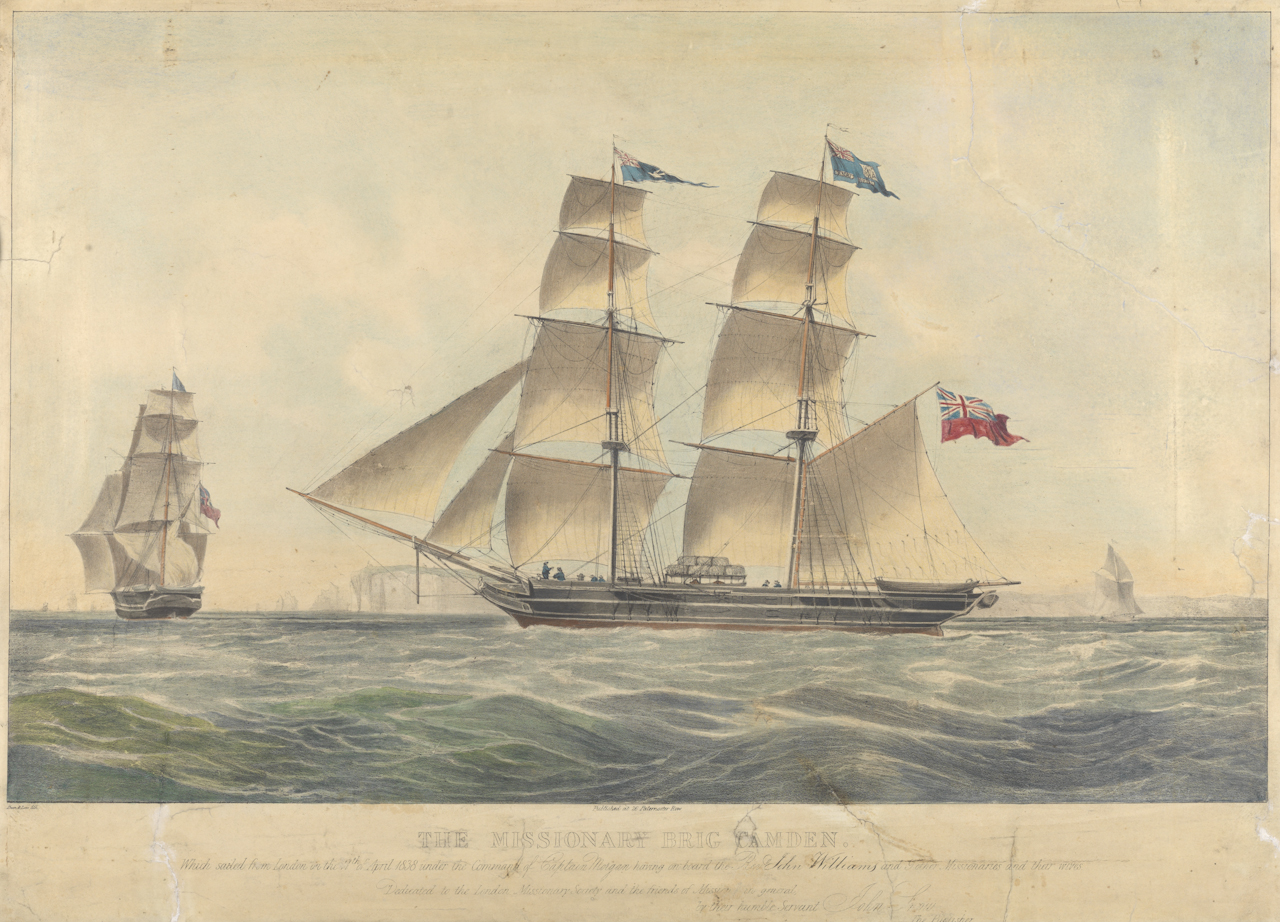
Her replacement the Camden, built 1809, bought 1838

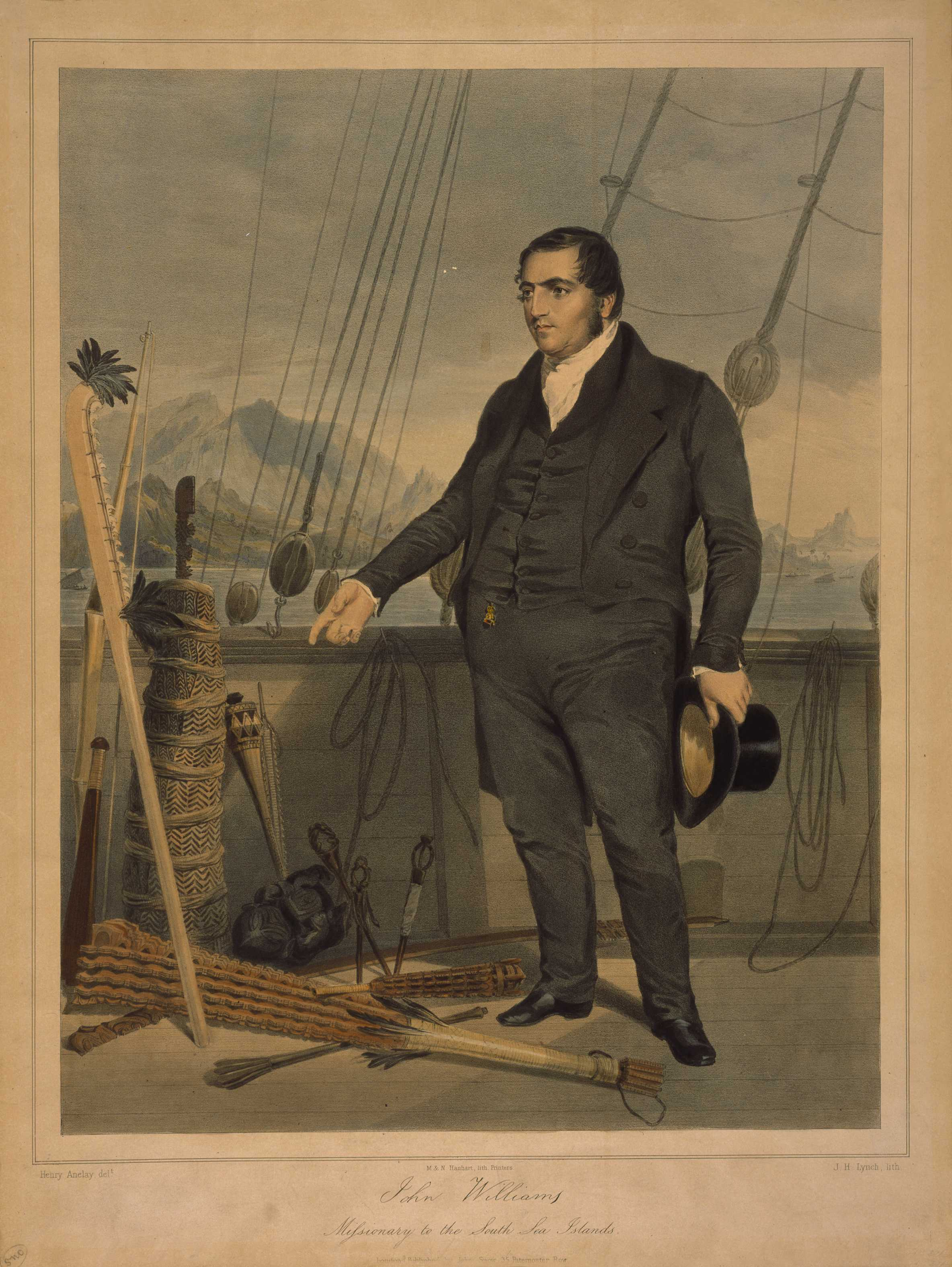
The Reverend John Williams on board the Camden
