= Congregational Christian Church of Samoa =

- Ekalesia Faʻapotopotoga Kerisiano Samoa (EFKS)
- Classification: Protestant
- Orientation: Congregationalism
- Region: Samoa, American Samoa, Fiji, United States, New Zealand, Australia
- Language: Samoan & English
- Headquarters: Māluapapa, Samoa
- Origin: 1830; Sapapali'i, Samoa
- Branched from: London Missionary Society
- Congregations: 325+
- Members: 500,000
- Seminaries: Mālua Theological College
- Official website: https://cccs.org.ws/

The Congregational Christian Church Samoa - CCCS (Samoan: Ekalesia Faʻapotopotoga Kerisiano Samoa - EFKS), is a Protestant and Congregationalist Christian denomination founded in Samoa by missionaries from the London Missionary Society.

The Congregational Christian Church of Samoa (CCCS/EFKS) was the first Christian denomination established in Samoa and American Samoa. Today, approximately 57% of the Samoan population belong to the CCCS/EFKS. It is one of the three largest Christian denominations in Samoa, alongside the Catholic Church and Methodist Churches.

While the church has experienced a decline in membership within Samoa due to migration, it maintains a strong presence abroad, with more than half of the Samoan diaspora affiliated with CCCS congregations overseas.

Prior to 1980, the CCCS/EFKS functioned as a unified Church across both Samoa and American Samoa. Today, it operates independently, while continuing to maintain a close affiliation with the Congregational Christian Church of American Samoa (EFKAS/CCCAS).

The CCCS/EFKS remains steadfast in providing spiritual guidance to its members, focusing on the teachings of Christ, fostering Christian fellowship, and offering practical support in everyday life. A unique aspect of the Church's ministry is its commitment to promoting use of the Samoan language (Gagana Samoa) in its worship services and daily operations. Moreover, the Church incorporates and upholds Samoan traditions and customs (Fa‘a Samoa), integrating cultural heritage with the expression of Christian faith. With over 500,000 adherents worldwide, the CCCS/EFKS continues to be a significant witness to the gospel, rooted in both faith and culture.

== History ==
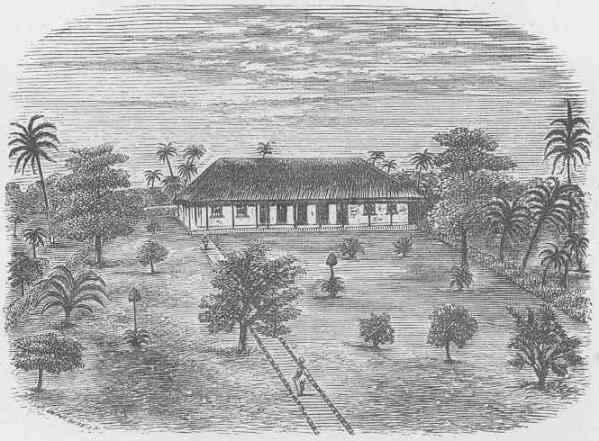
Institution at Malua, Samoa (LMS, 1869, p.14)

On 21 August 1830, the Messenger of Peace, a ship sent by the London Missionary Society, arrived at the shores of Samoa, landing at Sapapali'i, Savai'i (Mataniu-Feagai-ma-le-ata). Onboard were Reverend John Williams, along with Fa'uea and his wife Puaseisei, a Christian Samoan couple from Tonga, as well as missionary teachers from Tahiti and the Cook Islands.

A theory for the origin of the term Pālagi , commonly used by Samoans to refer to white people, is linked to the arrival of the Messenger of Peace. When the people of Sapapali'i first saw the missionaries dressed in white, they believed they had descended, or "exploded" (pa), from the heavens (lagi), leading to the adoption of the term.

At the time of the missionaries' arrival, Tamafaiga, a feared and violent Samoan warrior, had just been defeated. The islands were in the midst of intense warfare between local chiefs and villages. Exhausted by the constant violence and bloodshed, Malietoa Vainu'upo, a paramount chief of Sapapali'i and of noble lineage, embraced Christianity with pride. He decreed that all his followers and kin were to convert to Christianity immediately. Upon hearing of Malietoa's conversion and the swift spread of Christianity on the western Samoan islands, the Tui Manu'a (King of the Manu'a Islands) also embraced the faith. As a result, the Kingdom of Manu'a became a stronghold of the London Missionary Society.

Within a few years of the LMS's arrival, the majority of Samoa had embraced Christianity, a period known as the "Great Awakening". The wars between chiefs and villages came to an end, and the Samoan people turned to Christ for forgiveness and salvation. Nobles and commoners alike united in faith, offering themselves in large numbers for overseas mission work. In 1839, the first native Samoan missionaries were sent to Melanesia. These missionaries spread Christianity and established the Church in Tokelau, Niue, Tuvalu, Wallis and Futuna, Rotuma, the Solomon Islands, Kiribati, and notably in Papua New Guinea. Many of these missionaries never returned to Samoa and now rest in unmarked graves across the Pacific.

During the missionary period, the Samoan Church embraced a vision centered on the "social redemption of humanity" rooted in its understanding of God's sovereignty. Redemption was not viewed solely as a personal or individual experience, but as a divine purpose encompassing corporate, social, and political dimensions. The newly embraced faith focused on the transformation of both individual lives and broader society. This legacy continues to inspire the nation's ideals and remains a driving force behind the Church’s commitment to social engagement and service, both within Samoa and beyond.

== Formation into the CCCS/EFKS ==
In the latter half of the 20th century, the Samoan Islands experienced a renewed sense of national identity and confidence, both politically and spiritually. The Kingdom of Manu'a had since become part of American Samoa, while the western islands of Savai'i, Upolu, Apolima, and Manono were administered by New Zealand as Western Samoa. A significant milestone was reached in 1962, when Western Samoa gained independence from New Zealand, ushering in a new era of political sovereignty and paving the way for the autonomy of local churches, particularly those affiliated with the London Missionary Society and the Methodist Church.

That same year, the Samoan Church achieved independence from the London Missionary Society. At its inaugural General Assembly in 1962, the Church formally adopted the name Ekalesia Fa‘apotopotoga Kerisiano Samoa (EFKS), translated in English as the Congregational Christian Church of Samoa (CCCS).

Following its withdrawal, the London Missionary Society entrusted the oversight of its mission outposts in Tokelau, Tuvalu, Kiribati, Niue, and Papua New Guinea to the Congregational Christian Church of Samoa (CCCS), recognising the Church’s capacity to provide spiritual leadership and administrative guidance across these Pacific communities.

The transition was marked by close collaboration between LMS representatives and Samoan church leaders, who worked together to draft a Constitution and prepare the Church for self-governance. This historic moment signified not only ecclesiastical independence but also the affirmation of Samoan leadership and theological identity within the global Christian community.

== Mālua Theological College (Kolisi Fa'afaife'au i Mālua) ==
On 24 September 1844, Reverend George Turner of the London Missionary Society established Mālua Theological College, the first Theological College in the Pacific. Founded under the guiding vision 'For Jesus and His Church, the College was built upon a commitment to train and educate local students so that every village in Samoa would be served by a theologically trained pastor. Its vision was to also train and educate native Samoans for mission work in the outer islands of the Pacific. This vision continues to define the College’s purpose to this day.

The College was established at a site in Saleimoa, known as Māluapapa or Mālua, and commenced its first classes on 25 September 1844 with 25 single male students. In 1846, the institution began admitting married students, and the wives of these students quickly became an integral part of college life and mission activity. To commemorate its 50th anniversary, the Jubilee Church (Fale Iupeli) was erected in 1897. By the end of the 19th century, Mālua had trained and commissioned over a thousand missionaries who served across the Pacific, continuing the legacy of evangelism and service that the College was founded upon.

Today, Mālua Theological College continues its mission of preparing individuals for ministry within the Congregational Christian Church Samoa (EFKS). In addition to serving the Samoan Church, the College also trains students from Tokelau, Tuvalu, Kiribati, and other Pacific islands for pastoral and theological leadership. Mālua offers academic programs at the Diploma, Bachelor, and Master's levels, and provides scholarships to support further theological study at distinguished universities abroad. The College serves in partnership with its sister institutions across denominations, including Piula Theological College (Methodist), Moamoa Theological College (Catholic), and Kanana Fou Theological Seminary (Congregational Christian Church of American Samoa – CCCAS).

== Formation of independent Pacific churches ==
The Samoan District Council (SDC) of the London Missionary Society maintained governance and ecclesiastical authority over the London Missionary Society congregations in American Samoa, Tokelau, Tuvalu, Niue, Kiribati and Papua New Guinea. These regions were formally recognised as 'Mission Outposts' of the Samoan District and remained closely linked to the mother church in Samoa. In keeping with its missionary legacy, the SDC continued to send Samoan pastors to these districts to undertake mission work and serve as covenanted ministers, thereby preserving both spiritual and administrative continuity across the Pacific.

By the 1950s, the mission outpost in Tuvalu began advocating for ecclesiastical independence and the right to govern their own churches and affairs. With the full support of the Samoan District Council, these aspirations were eventually realised. Following the Samoan District Council’s own independence from the London Missionary Society in 1962—at which point it was formally established as the Congregational Christian Church Samoa (CCCS)—similar calls for autonomy emerged from the Districts in Niue, Kiribati, Papua New Guinea, American Samoa and Tokelau. The CCCS responded with wholehearted support, working collaboratively with these Outposts and Districts to help them achieve self-governance. This period marked a significant movement toward indigenous leadership and local ownership of the Christian mission across the Pacific.

- Tuvalu Outpost: Independent in 1958, forming the Christian Church of Tuvalu (Ekalesia Kelisiano Tuvalu).
- Niue District: Independent in 1966, forming the Congregational Christian Church of Niue (Ekalesia Niue).
- Kiribati District: Independent in 1968, forming the Kiribati Protestant Church.
- Papua New Guinea District: Independent in 1975, forming the United Church in Papua New Guinea and the Solomon Islands.
- American Samoa District: Independent in 1980, forming the Congregational Christian Church of American Samoa (Ekalesia Fa'apotopotoga Kerisiano i Amerika Samoa). This also included the majority of CCCS/EFKS congregations located in the United States and Hawai‘i.
- Tokelau District: Independent in 1996, forming the Congregational Christian Church of Tokelau (Ekalehia Fakapotopotoga Kelihiano Tokelau).

== Church mission and focus ==
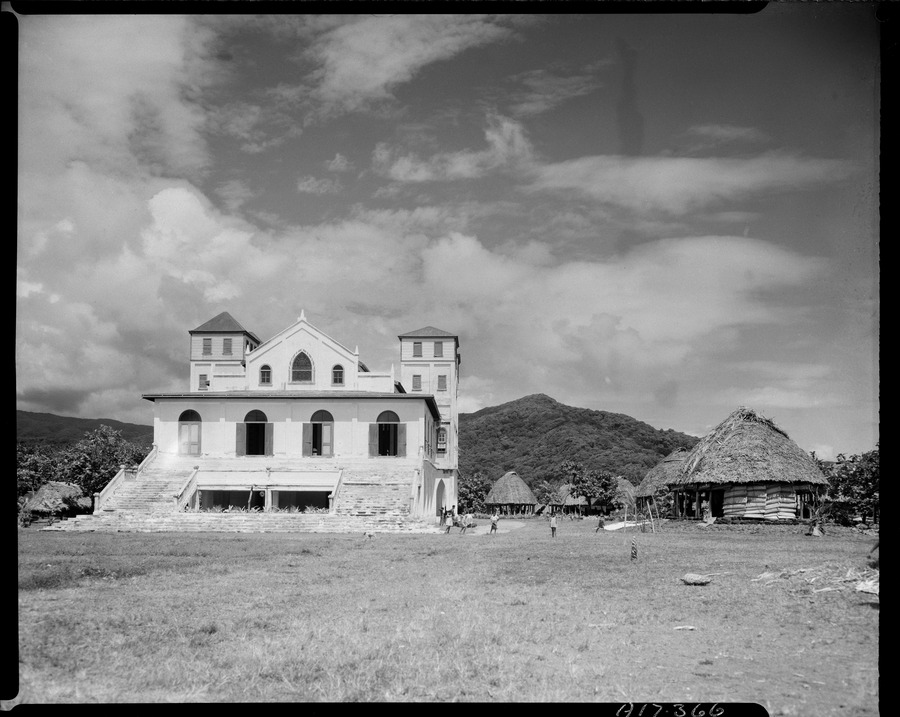
EFKS Church, Samoa 1948

The EFKS Church places its primary focus on the spiritual growth and nurture of its members. Central to its mission is the development of a deep and abiding faith in Christ, a clear understanding of His Divine Mission on earth, and a commitment to living and walking according to His teachings. Through worship, discipleship, and community life, the Church seeks to cultivate a Christ-centered faith that shapes both personal conduct and communal responsibility.

The EFKS Church places a strong emphasis on the significance of the Sacraments of Baptism, Holy Communion, and Marriage. The Church believes in the transformative and redemptive power of God, which is made manifest in the Resurrection of Christ. This divine power is to be reflected in both the words and actions of its members, guiding them to live in accordance with the teachings of Christ.

During the missionary era, the Samoan Church committed itself to the 'social redemption of humanity'—a vision deeply rooted in its understanding of God's sovereignty. Redemption was not viewed solely in personal or individual terms, but as a divine mandate encompassing corporate, social, and political dimensions. The Christian faith, as newly embraced by the Samoan people, centered on the holistic transformation of life and society. This legacy continues to shape both the nation’s idealism and the Church’s enduring commitment to active social engagement.

== Development projects ==
=== Samoan alphabet ===
The London Missionary Society’s initial efforts in Samoa were focused on educating the native Samoans in literacy and written communication. In the early years of their mission, the LMS missionaries, particularly Reverend George Pratt, made a significant contribution by developing the first Samoan alphabet, thereby introducing the Samoan language to written form. This achievement marked a pivotal moment in the cultural and linguistic development of Samoa.

=== Printing press ===
In 1839, the London Missionary Society furthered their commitment to spreading the Gospel through written work by establishing the first Printing Press in Samoa. This act not only demonstrated their missionary zeal but also underscored their belief in the importance of written literature as a means of conveying the Christian message. The establishment of the Printing Press allowed for the production of religious texts, educational materials, and other works that helped solidify the mission’s impact on Samoan society, enabling the people to engage with the Gospel through the written word. The 'O le Sulu Samoa', the first magazine in Samoa, is still in use today by the CCCS.

=== Tusi Pa'ia (The Holy Bible) ===
In 1855, Reverend George Pratt and missionaries from the London Missionary Society, in collaboration with well-versed Samoan orators, completed the translation of the Bible into the Samoan language, O le Tusi Pa'ia, in Avao, Savai'i. This translation remains in use to this day and has been instrumental in shaping the philosophical and theological language of Samoa, providing a foundational understanding of its linguistic and cultural intricacies. The text uses Roman numerals and uses the term 'Ieova' (Jehovah) in reference to Jesus Christ.

For many years, this Samoan translation served as the primary scripture in the churches of the London Missionary Society throughout the Pacific, including in Tokelau, Niue, Papua New Guinea, Kiribati, and Tuvalu, where worship was conducted in Samoan. It was only in recent years that the Bible was translated into the native languages of these regions. Despite this, the Samoan Language Bible continues to be widely utilized by Samoan churches of various denominations, remaining a central text in the faith and worship practices of the Samoan Christian community.

=== Education ===
The Congregational Christian Church of Samoa is dedicated to advancing education in Samoa through its network of schools and colleges, fostering both academic and spiritual growth within the community.

The Church maintains a strong presence in primary and secondary education, operating five schools across Samoa:

- Leulumoega Fou College
- Mālua Fou College
- Nu'uausala College
- Papauta Girls' College

In addition to its primary and secondary schools, the Church also runs three prominent tertiary educational institutions, each contributing to the intellectual and theological development of its students:

- Mālua Theological College
- Leulumoega School of Fine Arts
- Mālua Bible School (with a campus also operated in New Zealand)

== CCCS/EFKS Member Congregations & Structure ==
The Congregational Christian Church of Samoa (CCCS/EFKS) adheres to a congregationalist structure of governance, with a focus on shared leadership and decision-making. At the heart of this system is the Committee of Elders (Komiti o le 'Au Toea'i'ina), which holds the highest authority within the Church. The Committee oversees the General Assembly (Fono Tele), which serves as the ultimate governing body of the Church.

=== The General Assembly (Fono Tele) ===
The General Assembly is composed of Pastors and their wives, along with elected representatives from each CCCS congregation. This assembly is responsible for the Church's decision-making processes, including the setting of policies, theological direction, and overall governance. The Annual Fono Tele is held each year at the Church headquarters in Mālua, Samoa, where delegates gather to discuss and make critical decisions regarding the future of the Church.

=== Organisational Structure: Districts and Sub-Districts ===
The EFKS congregations are organised into Districts (Matāgaluega), which are further divided into Sub-Districts (Pulega). These Sub-Districts are local groups of congregations, each overseen by a Faife'au Toea'ina (Elder Pastor). The role of the Faife'au Toea'ina is to provide spiritual leadership, guidance, and oversight to the congregations within their jurisdiction, ensuring that the Church's teachings and practices remain consistent with its mission and values. There are 335 EFKS Congregations worldwide.

=== Geographic Presence ===
The EFKS Church is not only a significant religious body in Samoa but also has a broad international presence. The Church maintains congregations and Districts in Samoa, American Samoa, Hawai'i, New Zealand, and Australia, reflecting the global reach of Samoan communities and the Church's commitment to supporting the spiritual needs of the diaspora. The Church's organizational structure helps to maintain unity and coherence across these diverse congregations while preserving the Church's Samoan heritage and identity. The first Congregation outside of Samoa & American Samoa was founded in Suva, Fiji in 1903, followed by the establishment of a congregation in Moanalua, Hawai'i in 1954. In 1955, the Church expanded further to San Diego, USA, and in 1962, a congregation was established in Grey Lynn, Auckland, New Zealand. The Church's presence in Balmain, Sydney, Australia was established in 1983, reflecting the growing migration of Samoan families to the region. Mission outposts of the EFKS Church can be found in Jamaica, Canada and London. The Canada and London Mission Outposts caters to the small Samoan communities there.

Through its structured governance and widespread presence, the Congregational Christian Church of Samoa continues to play a pivotal role in the spiritual and cultural life of Samoan communities both in the Pacific and around the world.

== Ecumenical relationships ==
The EFKS Church collaborates closely with a variety of Christian organisations worldwide. It is an active member of several influential ecumenical bodies, including:

- Council for World Mission
- Samoa Council of Churches
- World Council of Churches of the Pacific
- Pacific Conference of Churches
- World Communion of Reformed Churches
- World Council of Churches

Through its participation in these global and regional organisations, the EFKS Church engages in collective mission efforts, promotes Christian unity, and contributes to addressing social and spiritual needs across the Pacific and beyond. These affiliations strengthen the Church's commitment to the Gospel and its active role in the global Christian community.

== See also ==
- EFKS TV
