= Nuʻuuli, American Samoa =

Nuʻuuli
- Village
- Etymology: Samoan: "black place"
- Location within American Samoa
- Coordinates: 14°19′7″S 170°43′25″W
- Country: United States
- Territory: American Samoa
- County: Ituau County

Government
  - Mayor: T. M. Puailoa

Area
  - Total: 3.04 sq mi (7.87 km^{2})

Population (2020)
  - Total: 4,991
  - Density: 1,640/sq mi (634/km^{2})

Nuʻuuli is a village on the central east coast of Tutuila Island, American Samoa. It is located on a peninsula several miles up from Pago Pago International Airport. Nuʻuuli is located between Pago Pago International Airport and Coconut Point. It is a shopping district which is home to stores, groceries and many more shops. In the early 20th century, Nuʻuuli was the headquarters for the Mau movement in American Samoa.

It is the fifth-largest village in land area in American Samoa and the second most populous one, after Tafuna. It straddles the line between the Eastern District and the Western District. This makes it the only village in American Samoa that occupies two districts. It has a total land area of 7.87 km^{2}, with 6.23 km^{2} being in the Eastern District and 1.64 km^{2} being in the Western District. Its total population as of the 2010 census was 3,955, with the Eastern District portion containing 2,844 persons and the Western District portion 2,310 persons.

Nuʻuuli is home to the largest wetland in American Samoa. The Nuʻuuli Pala is the largest mangrove swamp on Tutuila Island. Encompassing 123 acres, it is composed primarily of Oriental and Red mangroves. This environment supports a diverse range of fish and wildlife, sustains subsistence activities such as crab harvesting, and provides recreational opportunities including canoeing.

Nuʻuuli has one of the highest crime rates in American Samoa. The first neighborhood watch type program in the territory was established here by the Department of Public Safety in 2014.

== Etymology ==
The name of the village, Nuʻuuli, is derived from the Samoan language and translates into English as "black place" or "black land".

== History ==
Nuʻuuli was historically notable as the home of the cannibalistic and cruel orator chief Mageafaigā (Lagafuaina), who is mentioned in the legends of Tutuila and the Manuʻa Islands.

On October 10, 1966, First Lady Lady Bird Johnson dedicated Manulele Tausala Elementary School in Nuʻuuli. The school is named after the first lady.

In the 1990s, Peni “Ben” Solaita captained Nuʻuuli village's victorious fautasi, named Satani (“Satan”). Despite objections from the village pastor regarding the canoe's provocative name, Satani became a symbol of pride and competitive spirit for Nuʻuuli. Ben Solaita played a summer season with the Philadelphia Phillies, complementing his brother Tony Solaita’s achievement as the first Samoan Major League Baseball player.

In September 2019, seven members of the Nuʻuuli Church of Christ, including senior preachers, were arrested for assaulting a couple from their congregation. Some faced charges of third-degree assault and public peace disturbance, and one individual was ordered to leave American Samoa.

In the summer of 2024, two fires destroyed two buildings in Nuʻuuli: the chapel of the Church of Latter Day Saints and the Nu'uuli Shopping Center.

=== Mau movement ===
In 1920, after Governor Warren Terhune removed Mauga Moi Moi and Sātele Itulā from their District Governorships, the two leaders continued to organize anti-U.S. Navy council meetings (fono) by relocating to Nuʻuuli. This move established Nuʻuuli as the central headquarters for the Mau movement in American Samoa. In an effort to suppress the movement, Governor Terhune had Lieutenant Commander Creed H. Boucher arrested and deported for supporting the movement. However, these actions proved ineffective when Boucher's successor, A.C. Kail, chose to engage with the Mau movement in Nuʻuuli and support their objectives. Following Governor Terhune's suicide, several of his controversial laws were repealed, including the reinstatement of Mauga Moi Moi and Sātele Itulā to their positions as district governors in the Western and Eastern Districts.

In March 1922, E. T. Pollock assumed the role of the third governor of American Samoa within a span of three years. Prior to his arrival, Mau movement supporters from Nuʻuuli canvassed villages, encouraging residents to boycott meetings with the new governor. In response, Governor Pollock threatened to arrest these messengers. On March 15, 1922, Governor Pollock held his inaugural meeting with Mau leaders. Contrary to the Faʻa Sāmoa tradition, he requested that each of the five present Mau chiefs speak individually. Soliai of Nuʻuuli, with Helen Wilson acting as his translator, attempted to explain that it was customary to first meet the governor and discuss matters generally before consulting their community. However, Governor Pollock insisted, questioning Soliai's activities and implying neglect of traditional duties such as gathering thatch with women. Soliai outlined grievances against the previous administration under Governor Terhune. When Governor Pollock demanded a specific request, Soliai proposed the establishment of a council funded by increased taxes to facilitate collaborative governance between Samoans and Americans. Judge Hall opposed this proposal, arguing that tax increases would be unpopular and that the existing Fono was sufficient for lawmaking. Despite objections, Chief Soliai continued to advocate for a tax-supported new Fono. Governor Pollock then inquired if Soliai's wish was to serve as one of the new councilors funded by the additional taxes, to which Soliai declined. The meeting concluded without any agreement, and the following day, Mau chiefs presented Governor Pollock with a petition requesting the release of 17 imprisoned chiefs. Subsequently, a malaga — an organized inter-village visit — was conducted from Nuʻuuli to the Eastern District, resulting in the arrest of one hundred young men for demonstrating.

Chris Taliutafa Young, a descendant of Tui Manuʻa Matelita, joined the Mau movement at Nuʻuuli and rose to a leadership role as it matured and took on a political-party-like status. His relocation occurred alongside Arthur A. Greene’s newspaper campaign in support of the Mau. In 1927, Young invited Governor Stephen Victor Graham to visit the Mau headquarters at Nuʻuuli.

In November 1927, Governor Stephen Victor Graham visited Nuʻuuli and adopted a more conciliatory approach during his meeting with the Mau movement on November 14. Invited by the Mau, whose headquarters were situated in Nuʻuuli, Governor Graham's presence was greatly appreciated by the community. A Samoan orator remarked that the people felt honored by the Governor's willingness to engage in dialogue and listen to their concerns, unlike previous administrations that had treated them with contempt. Following the meeting, Governor Graham recommended to the U.S. Navy's secretary a strategy of patient and attentive listening to prevent conflicts. In the same year, the Mau movements in both American Samoa and Western Samoa unified under the name The Samoan League. Western Samoans played a key role in constructing the Mau meeting house in Nuʻuuli, which was considered the true Fono before the establishment of the current legislative body. This fale remained a gathering place until it was destroyed by Hurricane Ofa in 1990.

In 1930, Nuʻuuli served as one of four official sites for the Bingham Commission. There, the principal witness, Galeaʻi, submitted a letter said to bear 711 signatures and acknowledged that it had been prepared by Samuel S. Ripley, who had received more than US$2,500 over four years. After hearing the testimony, Guinn Williams of Texas admonished Mau leaders against sending money to private individuals and urged them instead to address the U.S. president or members of the U.S. Congress directly.

== Geography ==
Nuʻuuli lies at the southern foot of Mount Matafao, and is adjacent to the villages of Itulagi in the west. The best surfing conditions in American Samoa can be found in Faganeanea and neighboring Nuʻuuli, however, great surfing can also be found in the ʻAmanave-Poloa area.

=== Nuʻuuli Pala ===
Nuʻuuli Pala is Tutuila Island's largest mangrove swamp. It borders nearly all of Pala Lagoon's shoreline. The pala has been designated a special management area in recognition of its size and significance to wildlife and fish habitat. It is the largest and also the most threatened wetland in American Samoa. Since 1961, American Samoa has witnessed significant changes in its wetlands across different regions. Nuʻuuli has suffered the most substantial decline, losing approximately 61 acres, which is a 33% reduction.

While the marshes and swamps in American Samoa mostly feature plant species commonly found throughout the United States, mangrove wetlands that support mature forests—such as those in the village of Nuʻuuli — are rare. This scarcity is a key reason why the U.S. federal government places considerable emphasis on these mangrove wetlands.

The wetland, excluding the open water of the lagoon, covers 123 acres (50 ha) of mangrove forest and swamp. The majority of the swamp is covered with red mangrove and oriental mangrove. Several areas of other freshwater marsh vegetation are interspersed with the mangroves. A small area of saltwater marsh borders the end of Coconut Point. The wetland is an important wildlife and fish habitat, and also provides recreational opportunities as canoeing and fishing. Nuʻuuli Pala has been designated a Special Management Area under the American Samoa Coastal Management Act of 1990.

Rare species found here include Xylocarpus moluccensis (leʻileʻi) and the uncommon shrub Sophora tomentosa, which is also reported on Aunuʻu. Nuʻuuli Pala is a common feeding site for the Reef Heron (matuʻu), a bird species which usually feeds on the coral reefs.

=== Nuʻuuli Falls ===
Nuʻuuli Falls is a 65 feet (20 m) secluded cascade with a swimming hole beneath. To get here, turn left at Nuʻuuli Family Mart when coming from the west. Follow this road veering left at the pig farm. Enter the trailhead and follow the hiking trail for about 15 minutes. Veer left at the first trail juncture, and follow until the trail reaches the stream. Nuʻuuli Falls is made up of seven individual waterfalls.

== Economy ==
Nuʻuuli is the commercial center of Tutuila Island. There is a large number of mini-marts, sewing shops, and clothing stores along Main Road. Nuʻuuli is also home to several hardware and home-improvement shops, along with salons and souvenir stores.

Nuʻuuli Twin Cinemas is the only movie theater in American Samoa and has two screens. It plays major blockbuster films, children's movies, and more. Just past the theater is Laufou Shopping Center. An area in Nuʻuuli is known as Coconut Point and is home to a combination of local villagers and contract workers.

== Demographics ==
Year	Population
2020	4,991
2010	3,955
2000	5,154
1990	3,893
1980	2,585
1970	1,804
1960	1,137

Nuʻuuli village had the highest number of registered voters as of 2017 with a total of 1,717 registered voters, followed by the villages of Leone, Tafuna, and Pago Pago.

== Notable people ==
- Freddie Letuli, dancer
- Lonnie Palelei, NFL football player
- Maa Tanuvasa, NFL football player
- Tony Solaita, first American Samoan MLB-player.
- Lemanu Peleti Mauga, governor
- Joe Taufeteʻe, rugby player
- Malaetasi Togafau, politician and judge
