= Western District, American Samoa =

District in American Samoa

Coordinates: 14°19′00″S 170°46′00″W

Western District
- District
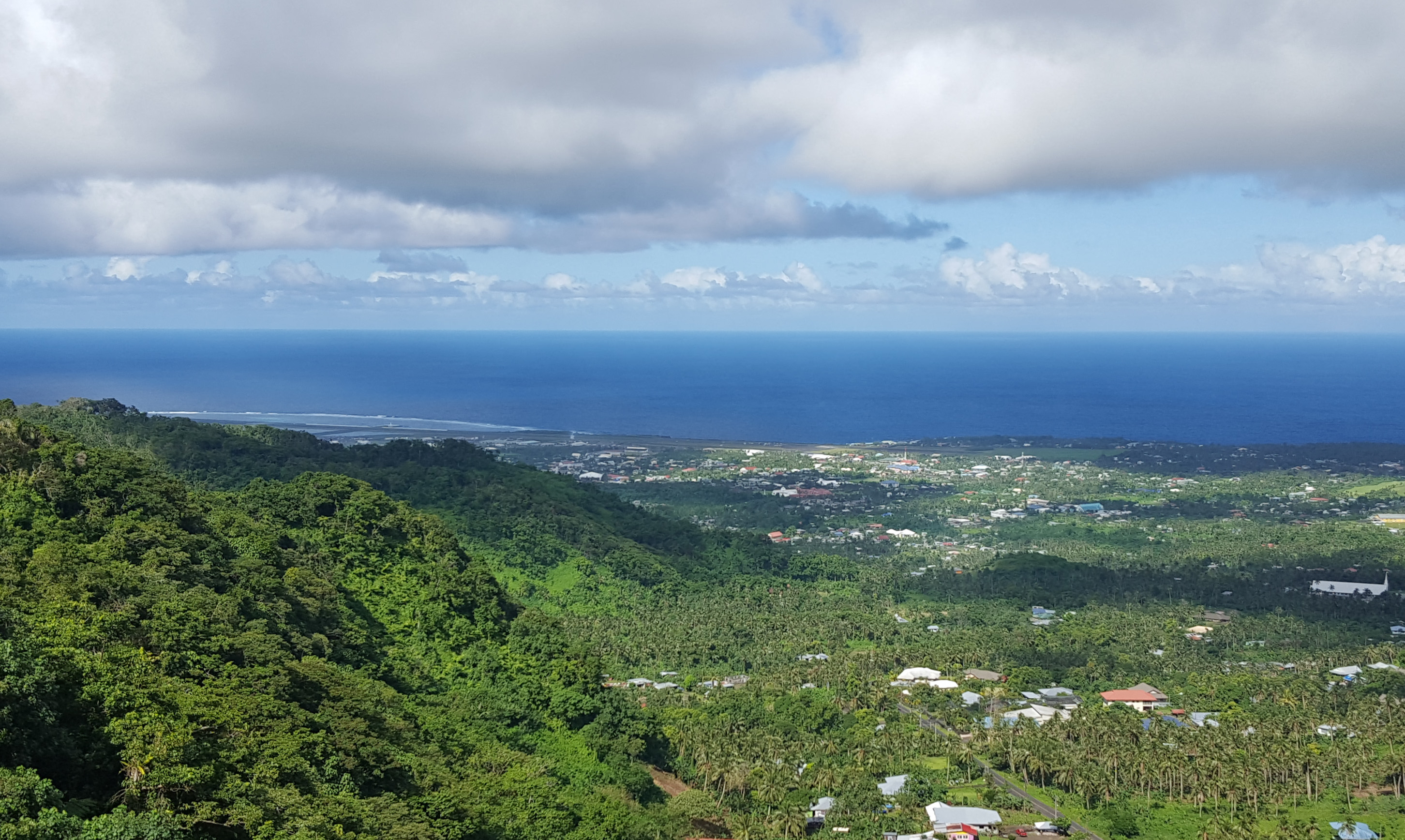
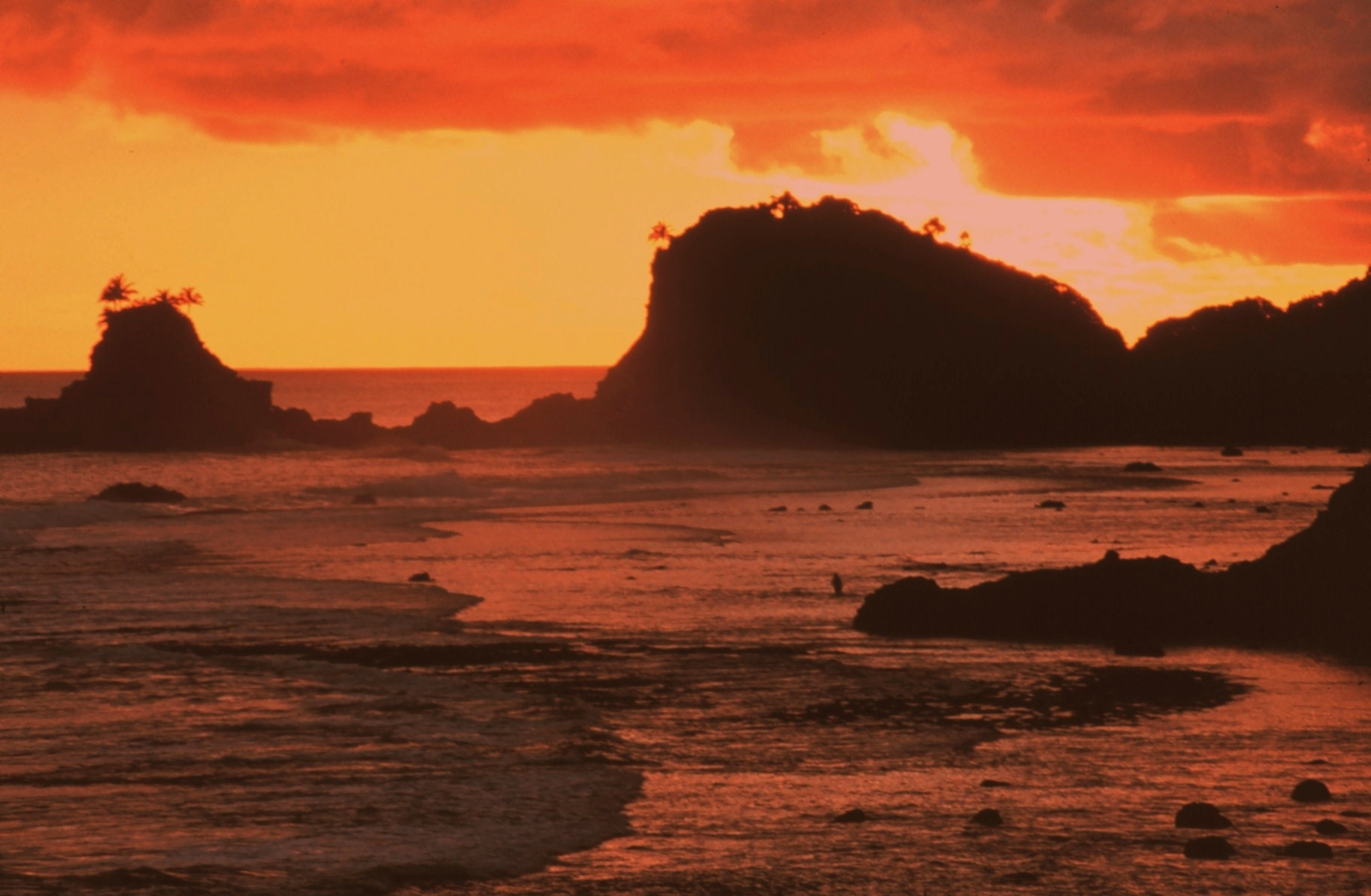
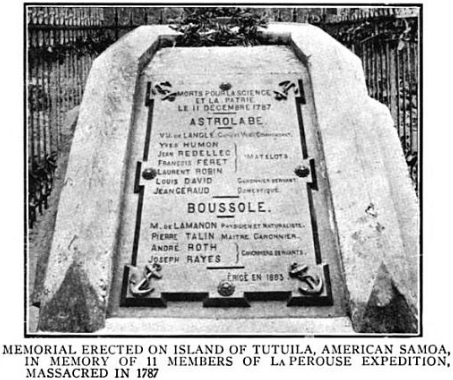
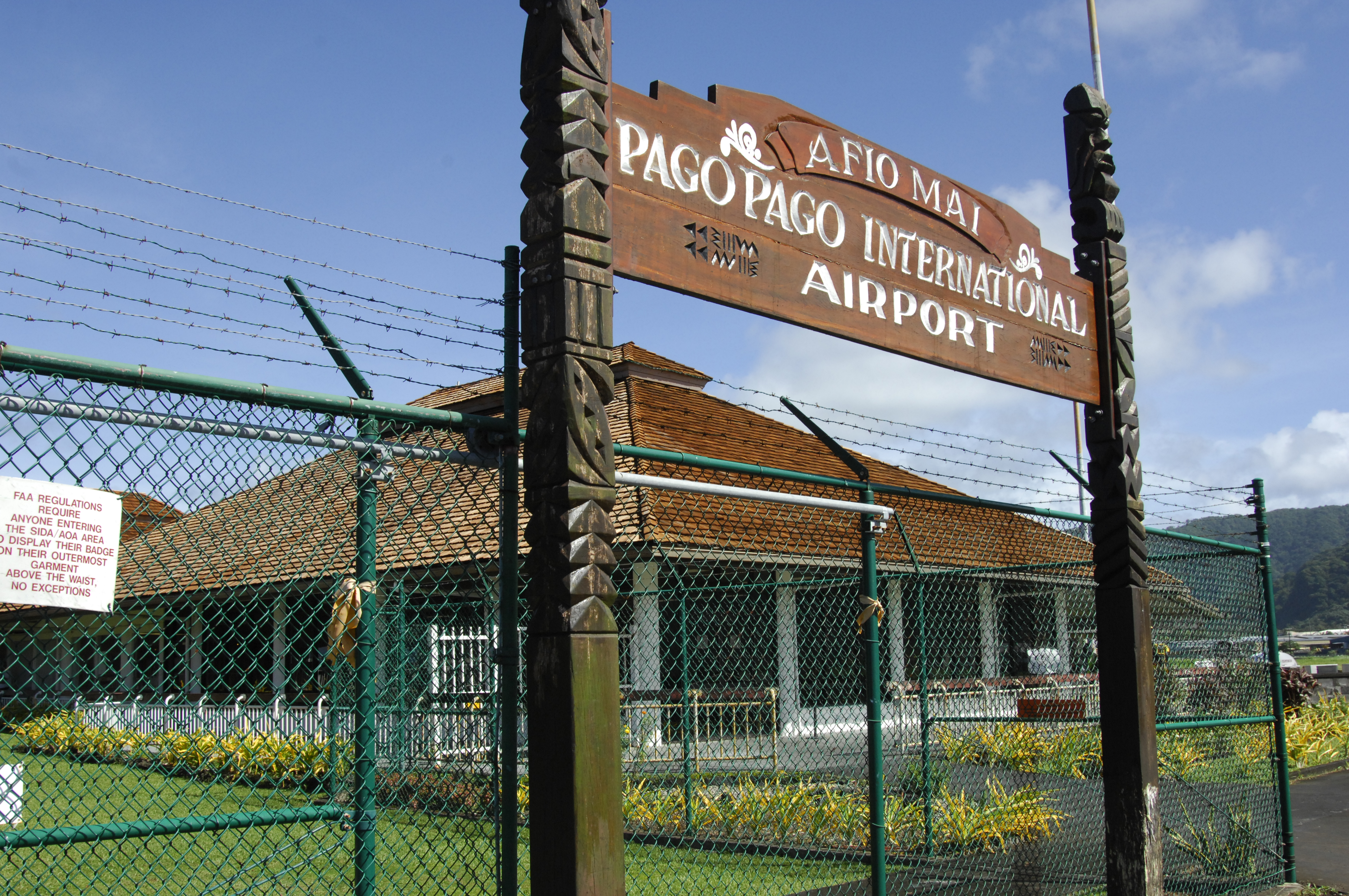
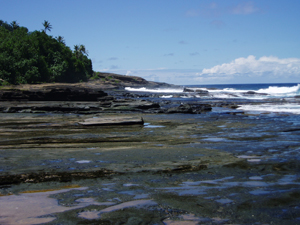
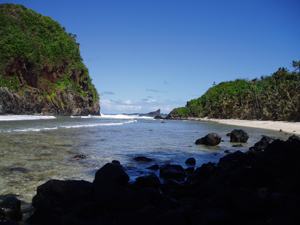
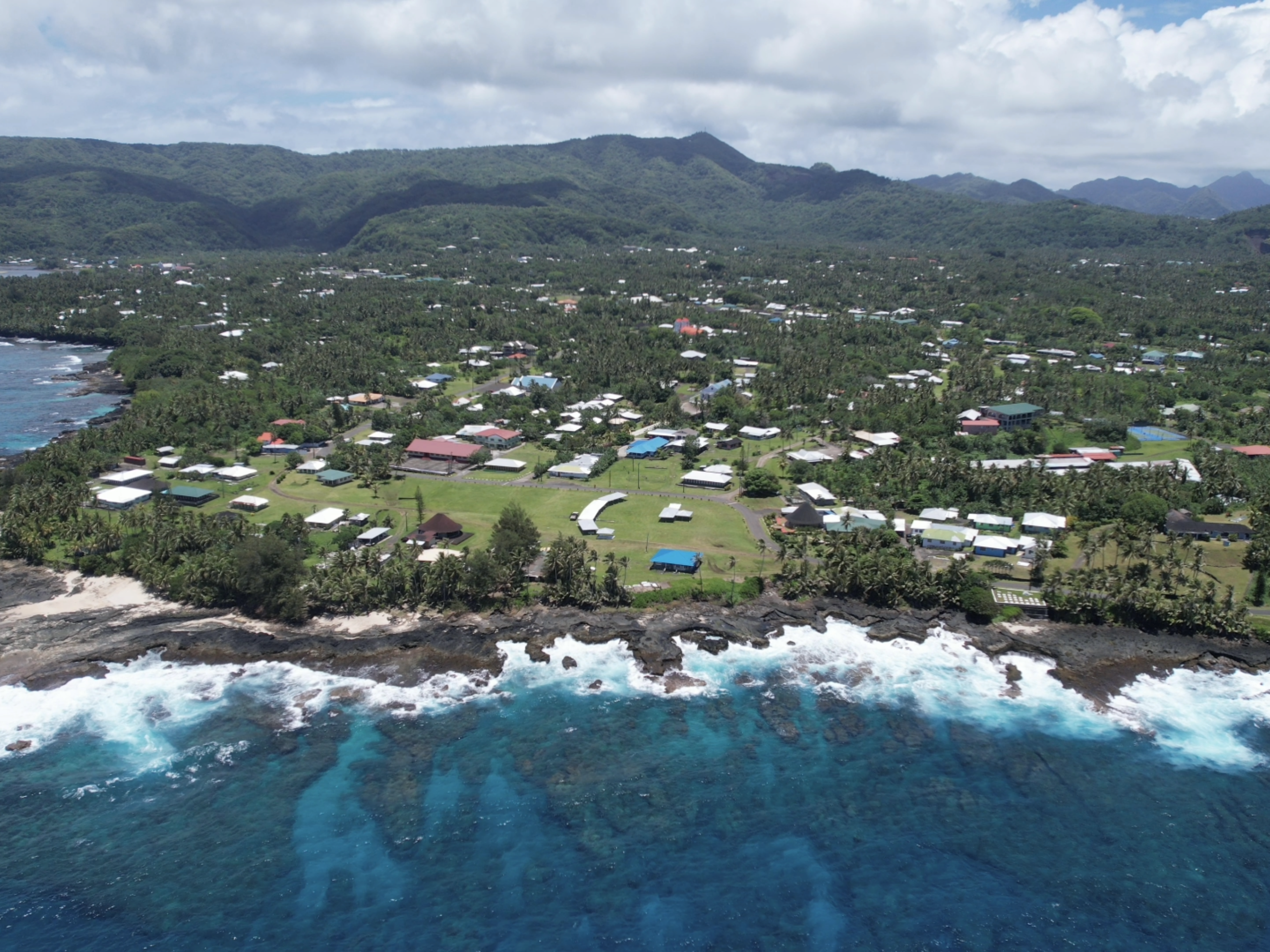
- Tāfuna Fagatele Bay Lapérouse Memorial Pago Pago International Airport Le'ala Shoreline National Natural Landmark Cape Taputapu National Natural Landmark Vailoatai

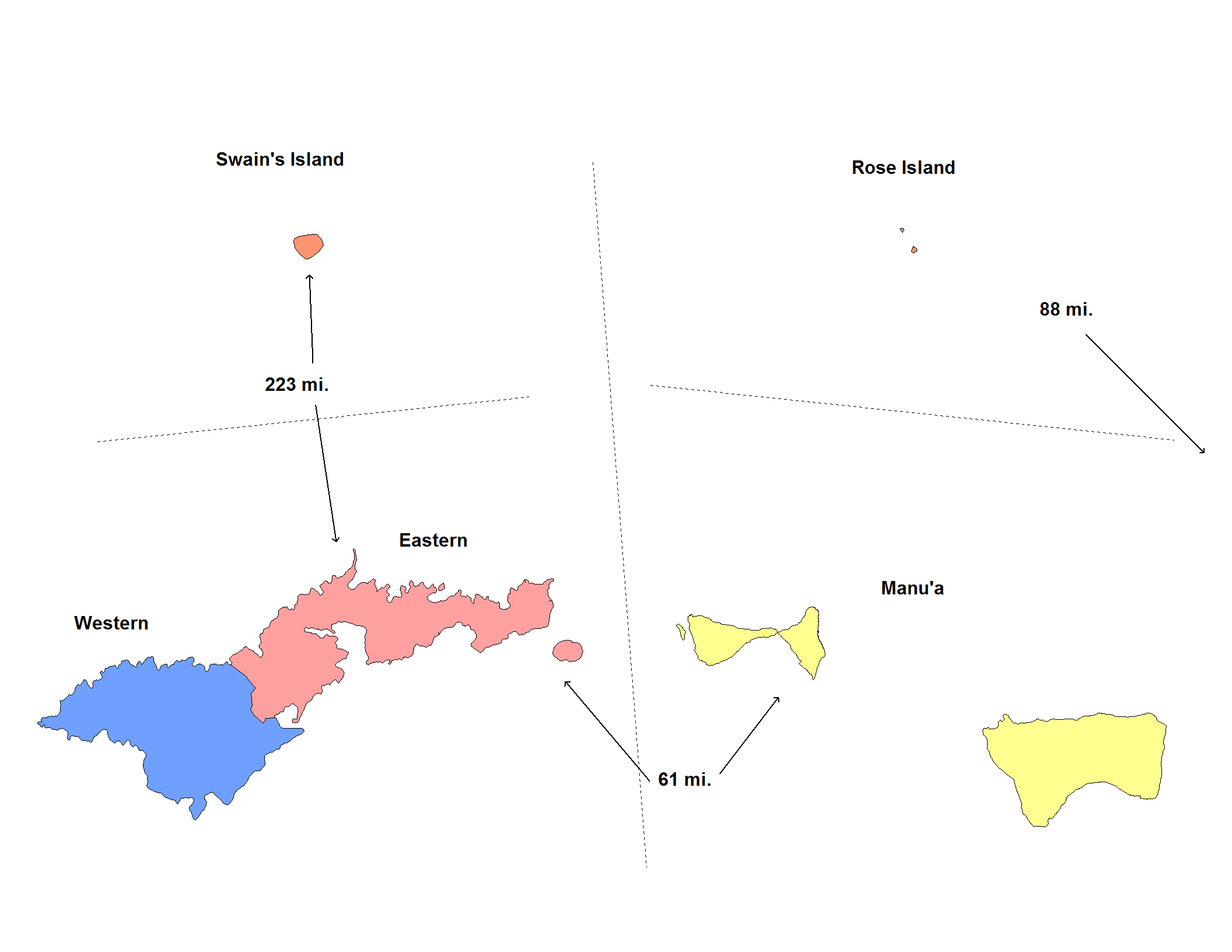
- The Western District of American Samoa is shown in blue
- Country: United States
- Territory: American Samoa
- Island: Tutuila
- Named for: Falelima Sisifo
- Largest city: Tāfuna

Government
  - District Governor: HTC Tuiagamoa Tavai

Area
  - Total: 28.873 sq mi (74.78 km^{2})

Population (2020)
  - Total: 31,819
  - Density: 1,102.0/sq mi (425.50/km^{2})
- Time zone: UTC−11 (Pacific Time Zone)
- ZIP code: 96799
- Area code: +1 684

The Western District is one of the three primary divisions of American Samoa. It consists of the western portion of Tutuila Island. It has a land area of 74.781 km^{2} (28.873 sq mi) and contains 29 villages plus a part of Nuʻuuli village. Among these is the largest village of American Samoa, Tafuna, at its eastern end. The district's total population as of the 2010 census was 31,329.

In addition to the western half of Tutuila Island, the Western District also includes several smaller islets, such as Taputapu Island, Toatai Rock, Niuolepava Rock, Utumatuu Rock, Liuvaatoga Rock, Luania Rocks, Manuelo Rock, and Nuutavana Rock.

Dental and medical care to residents of the Western District are offered by Tafuna Community Health Center.

== History ==
The island of Tutuila was historically divided into nine traditional "counties" known as faalupega. The western counties were collectively referred to as Fofō and Aitulagi (also called Falelima Sisifo). In the early 20th century, American Samoa's first Governor, Commander Benjamin Franklin Tilley, restructured these divisions for administrative purposes. He designated the western region as the "Western District" and appointed one of the area's chiefs to serve as District Governor. Each county encompassed multiple villages. To enhance local governance, Governor Tilley selected prominent chiefs from these villages, appointing them as Pulenuu (mayors). These appointments were based on recommendations provided by local leaders within the respective counties and villages. Similarly, the eastern part of the island, traditionally known as Falelima Sasa'e, was renamed the "Eastern District" under Tilley’s administration.

In 1900, the first clear clash between Samoan customs and U.S. law took place. A resident of Tualauta County named Fagaima caught a skipjack — traditionally reserved only for high chiefs — and prepared it for his meal. Outraged, High Chief Letuli of Tualauta County ordered the destruction of Fagaima’s house and crops, as well as his banishment. Seeking refuge, Fagaima turned to High Chief Tuitele of Leone, who also served as the District Governor of the Western District. When Letuli ignored Tuitele’s summons, Tuitele reported the incident to Governor Benjamin Franklin Tilley. As a result, Letuli was arrested, convicted of violating U.S. law, and required to compensate Fagaima for the losses. He was also confined to Pago Pago for a year and stripped of his high-chief duties during that time.

In 1902, opposition to the copra tax arose among Tutuilans, especially within the Western District and notably in Tuālāuta County, which would later become a significant place for the Mau movement. In response to this resistance, Governor Uriel Sebree detained three local chiefs to discourage their supporters and dismissed a Samoan judge who had submitted a protest petition to the U.S. Navy. Governor Sebree described Samoans as “grown-up children who love form and ceremony.” In 1904, during formal assemblies, chiefs from both the Western and Eastern Districts appealed for a reduction in the copra tax and raised concerns about the government's expenditure of the collected funds. Demonstrating their unity, they engaged in a malaga — a government-prohibited inter-village visit — traveling from Pago Pago to Leone to express their collective stance.

In 1904, the first public school in American Sāmoa was opened in the naval station area. Unable to obtain government funds, the Western District raised US$5,000 to establish its own school. By 1909, three schools were operating in the territory.

During the 1920s, the Western District served as a key hub of the Mau movement, with the villages of Faleniu and Leone functioning as Mau centers. In 1920, Governor Warren Terhune dismissed High Chief Sātele Itulā from the governorship of the Western District for his role in helping Mauga Moi Moi organize the movement. In defiance of this removal, Sātele Itulā continued to organize anti-U.S. Navy council meetings. Sam Ripley of Leone became a leader of the Mau movement upon his return to American Samoa in July 1920. This involvement led to his exile by the U.S. government, which sought to suppress the movement.

In the summer of 1920, Faleniu was the site of the infamous “Faleniu 17” (also referred to as the “Faleniu conspirators”), where the U.S. Navy deployed the armed Fita Fita guard to act as a militia against the local chiefs. These guards were dispatched to the village to disband an anti-government assembly (fono). Seventeen chiefs were escorted to Pago Pago alongside the Fita Fita guards and faced trial the following day. Of these, ten were sentenced to seven and a half years in prison with hard labor and twelve and a half years of probation, while the remaining seven received five-year prison terms and ten years of probation. Additionally, all the defendants were stripped of their titles, an action that was particularly offensive since the cession treaties had promised not to interfere with Faʻa Sāmoa.

In the early 20th century, leadership within American Samoa exhibited differing preferences regarding the territory's administration. High Chief Tuitele and Talking Chief Leoso, along with their supporters in the Western District, advocated for the establishment of a civilian administration. In contrast, leaders from the Manu'a Islands, including Talking Chief Tauanu'u, favored the continuation of U.S. Naval Administration, a position Tauanu'u publicly reaffirmed in 1950. On June 18, 1947, the U.S. Secretaries of State, War, Navy, and the Interior Department collectively recommended to President Harry S. Truman that responsibility for American Samoa and the Trust Territory of the Pacific Islands be transferred to the Interior Department. Subsequently, President Truman instructed the Secretaries of the Navy and the Interior to collaborate on plans for this administrative transition.

== District divisions ==
- Lealataua County
- Leasina County
- Tualatai County
- Tualauta County

== Demographics ==
Historical population
Year	Pop.	±%
1900	1,702	—
1912	2,268	+33.3%
1920	2,408	+6.2%
1930	2,777	+15.3%
1940	3,431	+23.6%
1950	5,330	+55.3%
1960	6,113	+14.7%
1970	9,018	+47.5%
1980	13,227	+46.7%
1990	23,868	+80.4%
2000	32,435	+35.9%
2010	31,329	−3.4%
2020	31,819	+1.6%
U.S. Decennial Census

Western District of Tutuila was first recorded beginning with the 1900 U.S. Census. No census was taken in 1910, but a special census was taken in 1912. Regular decennial censuses were taken beginning in 1920.

The population of American Samoa is predominantly concentrated in the Western District. Between 1970 and 2010, the population of American Samoa grew by nearly 40,000, with the Western District accounting for a significant portion of this growth, adding over 22,000 residents. By 2015, the overall population increase reached just over 37,000, driven primarily by growth in the Western District.

Between 2010 and 2020, the demographic trends in American Samoa shifted, with the territory experiencing a population decline of 10.5 percent. Despite this overall decrease, Tuālāuta County in the Western District emerged as an exception, recording a 9.4 percent population increase, making it the only county in the territory to experience growth during this period. Tuālāuta County is the largest county in American Samoa by both area and population. It is home to Tāfuna, the largest town in the territory.

== See also ==
- Eastern District, American Samoa
- Manu'a District, American Samoa
