= Creed H. Boucher =

Creed Haymond Boucher (March 3, 1888 - January 7, 1964) was a Lieutenant Commander in the United States Navy who served as second in command under Governor Warren Terhune at Naval Station Tutuila in American Samoa. During his tenure in 1920, he aligned with the Mau movement and challenged the Governor's authority—actions that led to his court-martial and eventual dismissal from the Navy. The court found that Boucher's involvement with the Mau movement had influenced unrest among the Samoans, prompting Secretary Josephus Daniels to warn that his conduct might have led to an insurrection.

== Mau movement ==
On May 3, 1920, Lieutenant Commander Boucher arrived in American Samoa to serve as executive officer at the United States Naval Station Tutuila, second in command to Governor Warren Terhune. Shortly after his arrival, he became closely involved with the Mau movement. He also encouraged further dissent among local residents. Boucher was rumored — according to Governor Terhune — to have openly discussed taking control of local affairs before even setting foot on the island. He soon met with Mauga Moi Moi to learn about his concerns and launched an inquiry into potential mismanagement of copra funds by A. M. Noble.

During his brief tenure, Boucher investigated the Secretary of Native Affairs, A.M. Noble, and sent his findings directly to the Chief of Naval Operations in Washington, D.C., without consulting Governor Terhune. Within three months, he openly urged resistance to the territorial administration. Presenting himself to local businessman B. Kneubuhl as a member of the U.S. Secret Service, Boucher examined A.M. Noble's financial records and urged enlisted personnel, junior officers, and Samoan residents to bring forth any evidence of wrongdoing. He also adopted a Samoan title signifying “new ruler” and carried a pistol at his side. On June 21, 1920, Boucher confronted Governor Terhune with an ultimatum demanding A.M. Noble's dismissal for allegedly diverting copra taxes and suggesting that he assume Noble's position.

In response, Governor Terhune requested Boucher's removal from duty and had him arrested, confining him to quarters in Pago Pago. Despite this, Noble accused Boucher of prompting Mauga Moi Moi and Sātele Itulā to organize their fono. Mauga Moi Moi maintained that Samoans trusted Boucher, yet the Governor deported Boucher and dismissed both Mauga Moi Moi and Satele from their posts as District Governors. Boucher's successor, Arthur C. Kail, soon joined Arthur A. Greene in supporting the Mau movement, offering Governor Terhune little relief. Meanwhile, Boucher arrived in San Francisco carrying a petition from the Mau movement to President Woodrow Wilson. In response, the Secretary of the Navy, Josephus Daniels, sent a court of inquiry, led by Governor Waldo A. Evans, to Samoa. The inquiry court-martialed Boucher in absentia, leading to his dismissal from the U.S. Navy.

On November 24, 1920, the court concluded that Boucher and Arthur A. Greene were instrumental in prompting the native unrest known as the Mau movement. Josephus Daniels insisted that President Woodrow Wilson approve his sentence, citing the potential for Boucher's actions to spark an uprising in Samoa. After his removal, Boucher appealed to Edwin Denby — the newly appointed Republican Secretary of the Navy — seeking reinstatement and alleging that his dismissal had been orchestrated under the direct orders and collusion of the previous Secretary.
