= Eastern District, American Samoa =

District of American Samoa

Coordinates: 14°16′00″S 170°39′00″W

Eastern District
- District
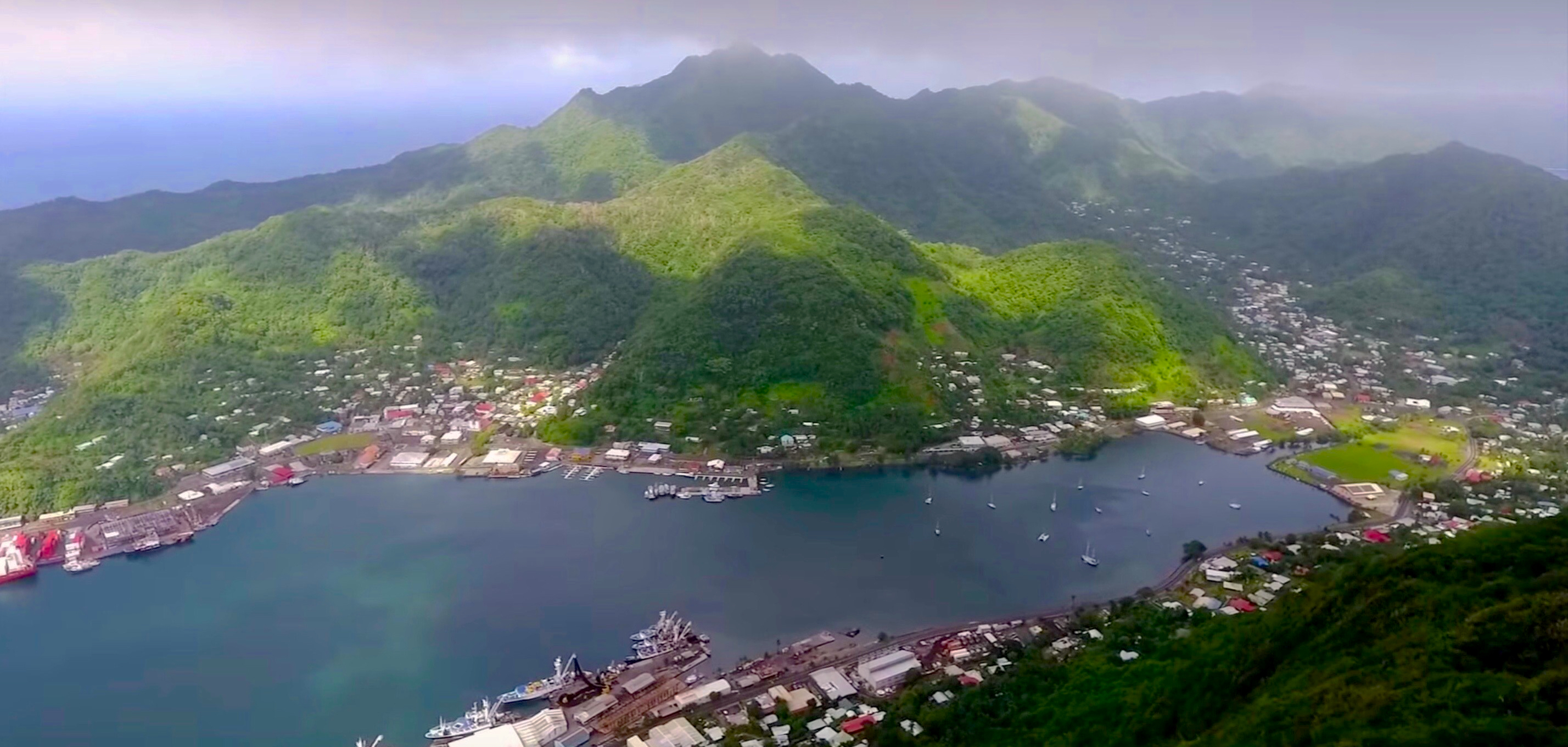
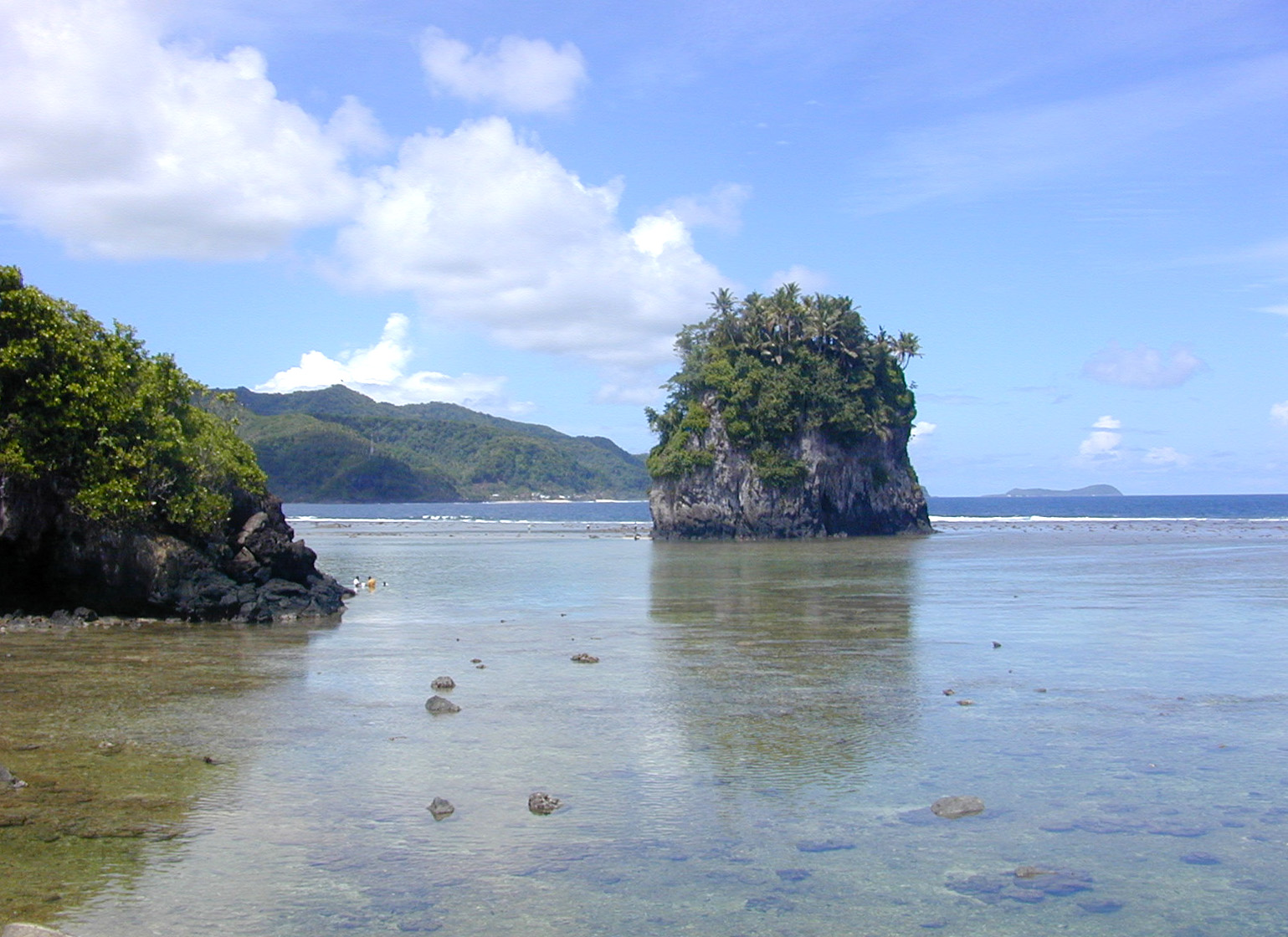
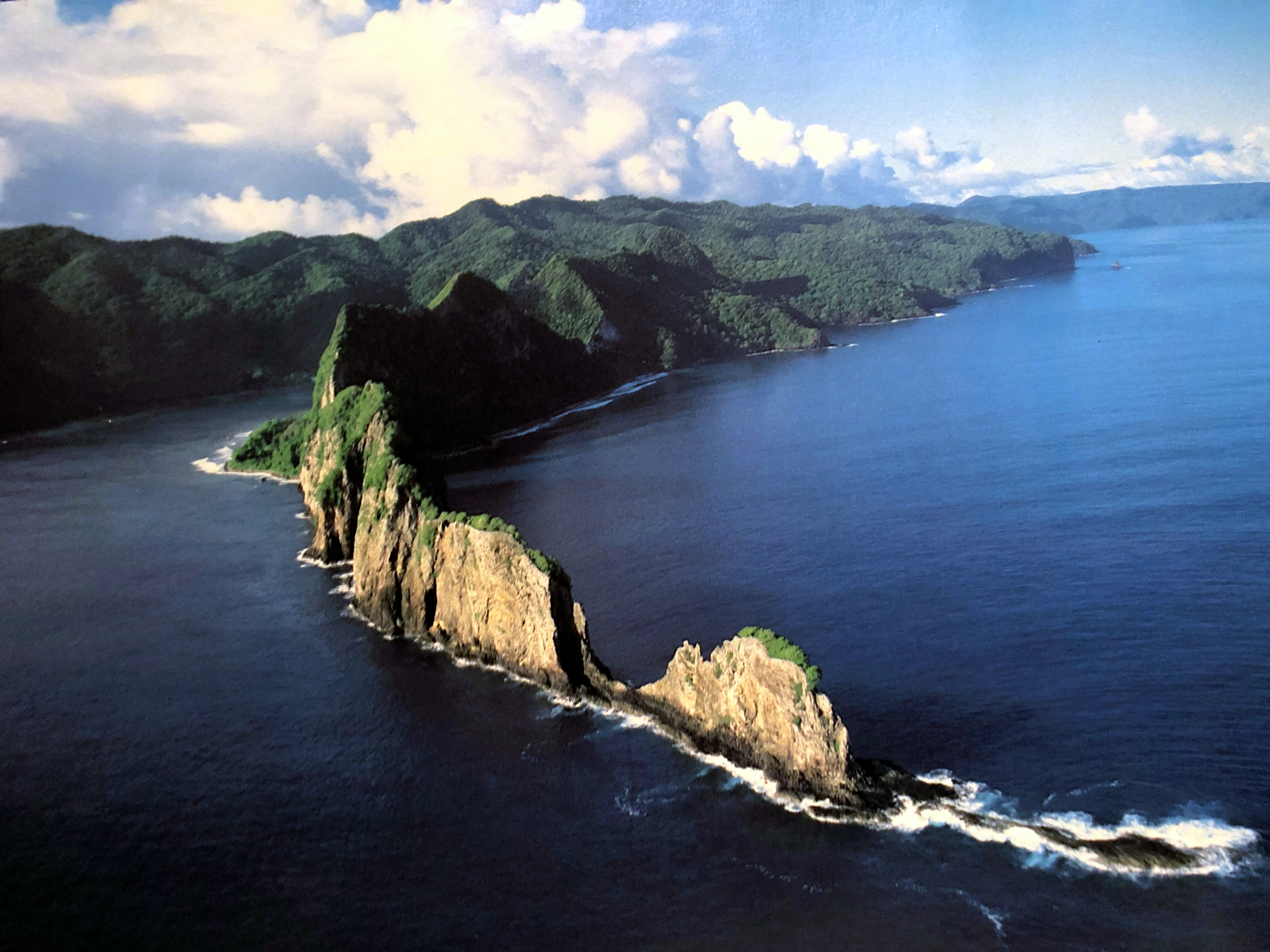
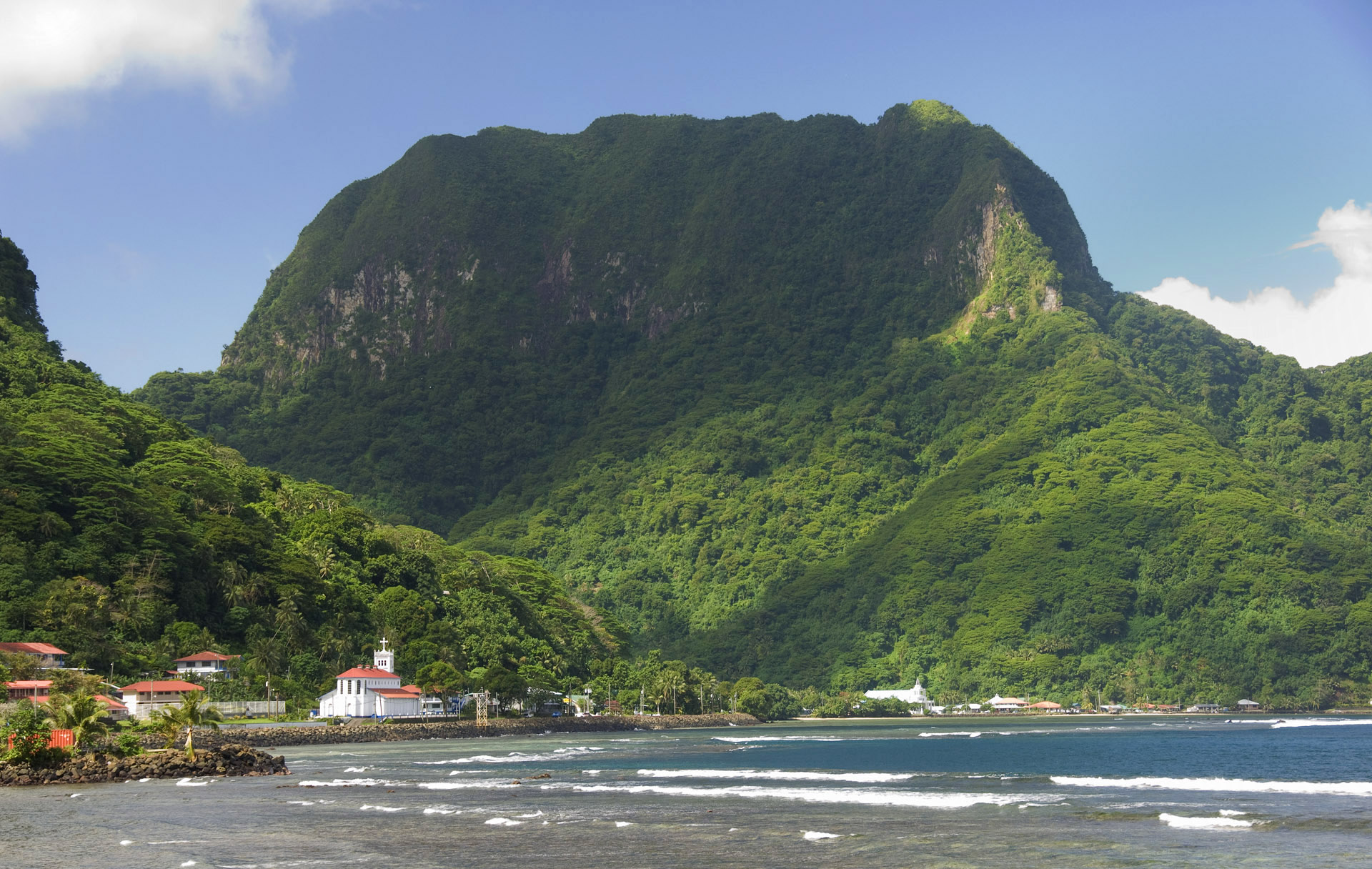
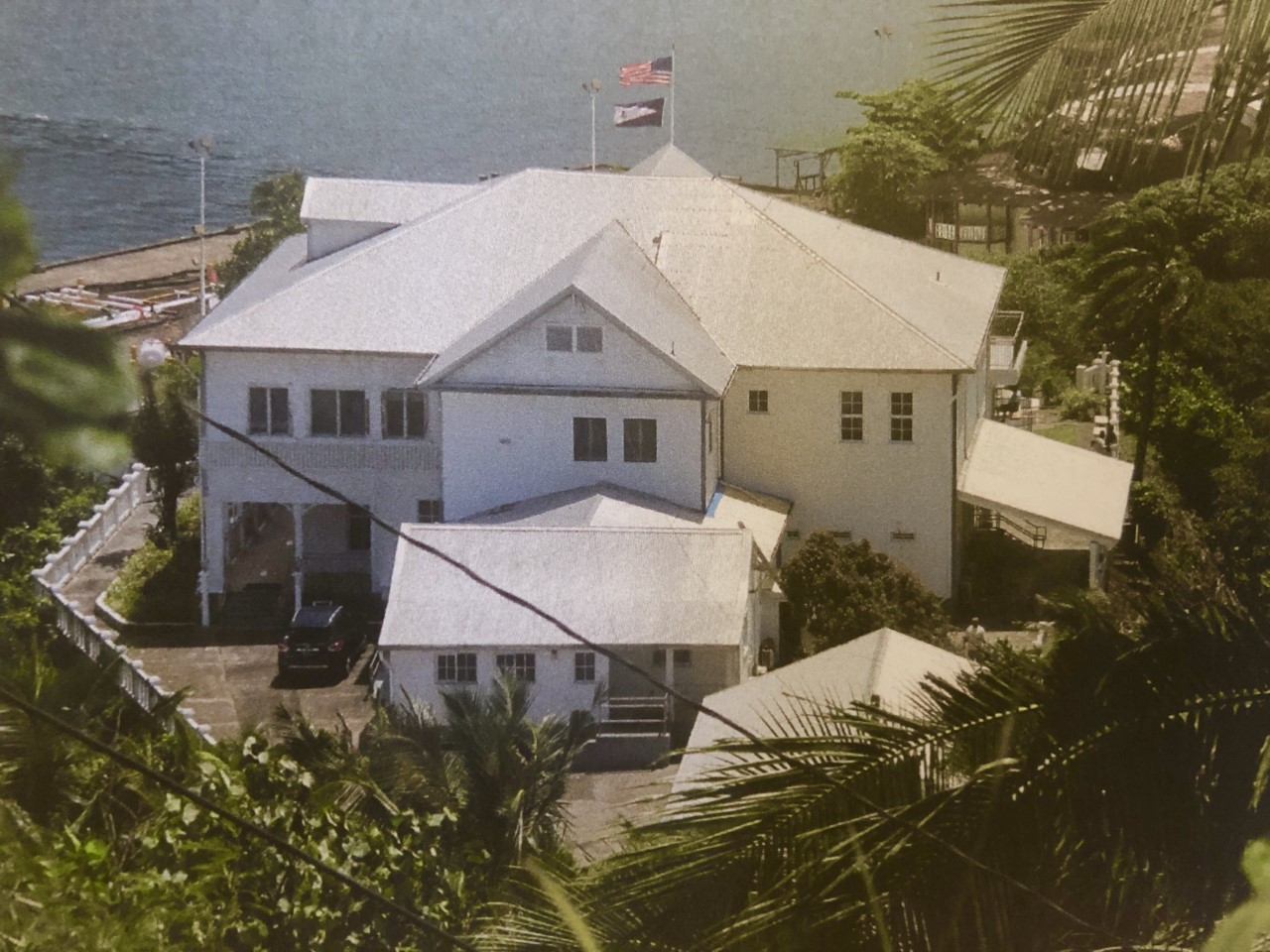
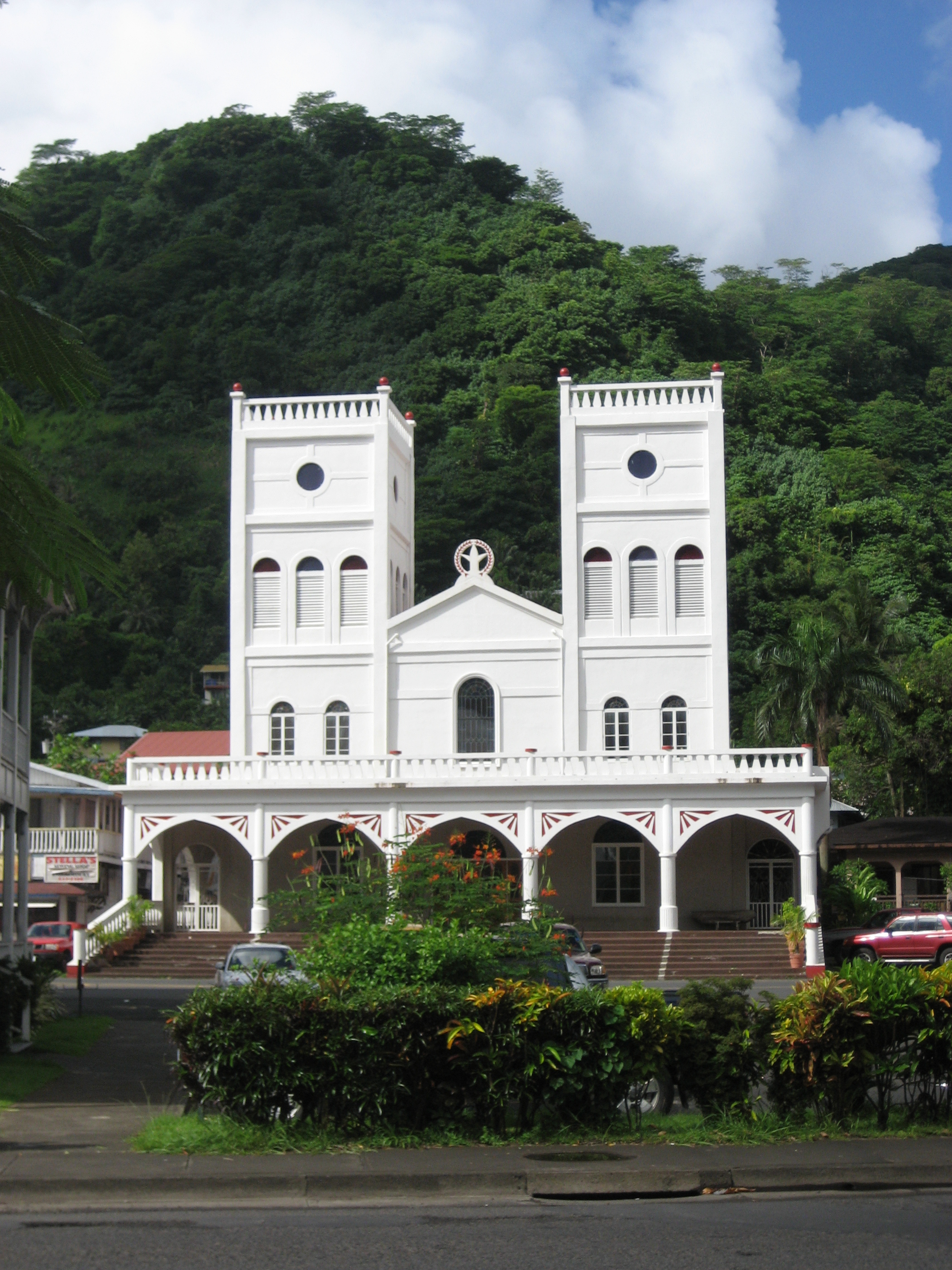
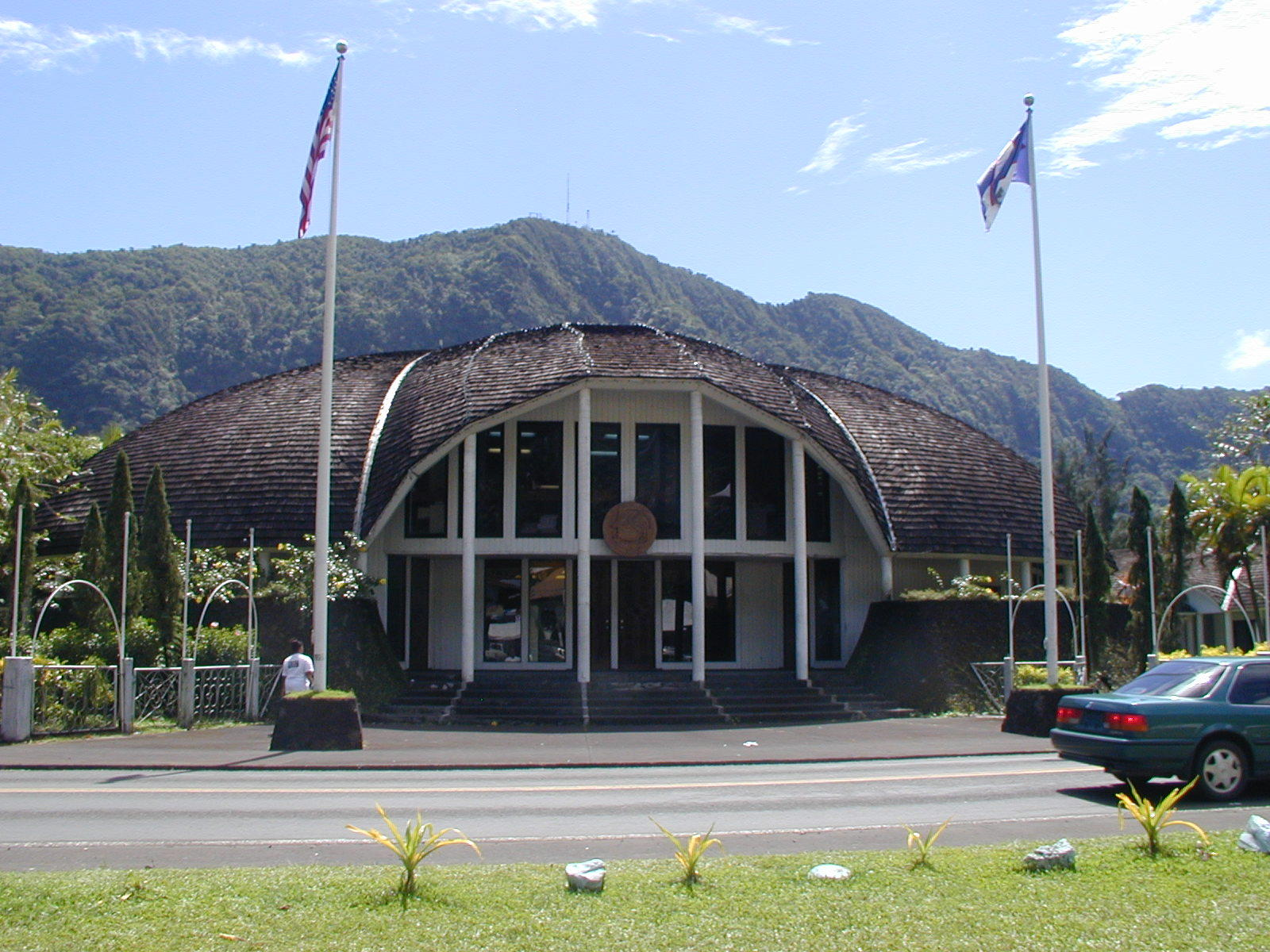
- Pago Pago Fatu Rock Pola Island Rainmaker Mountain Government House Congregational Christian Church in Fagatogo The Fono

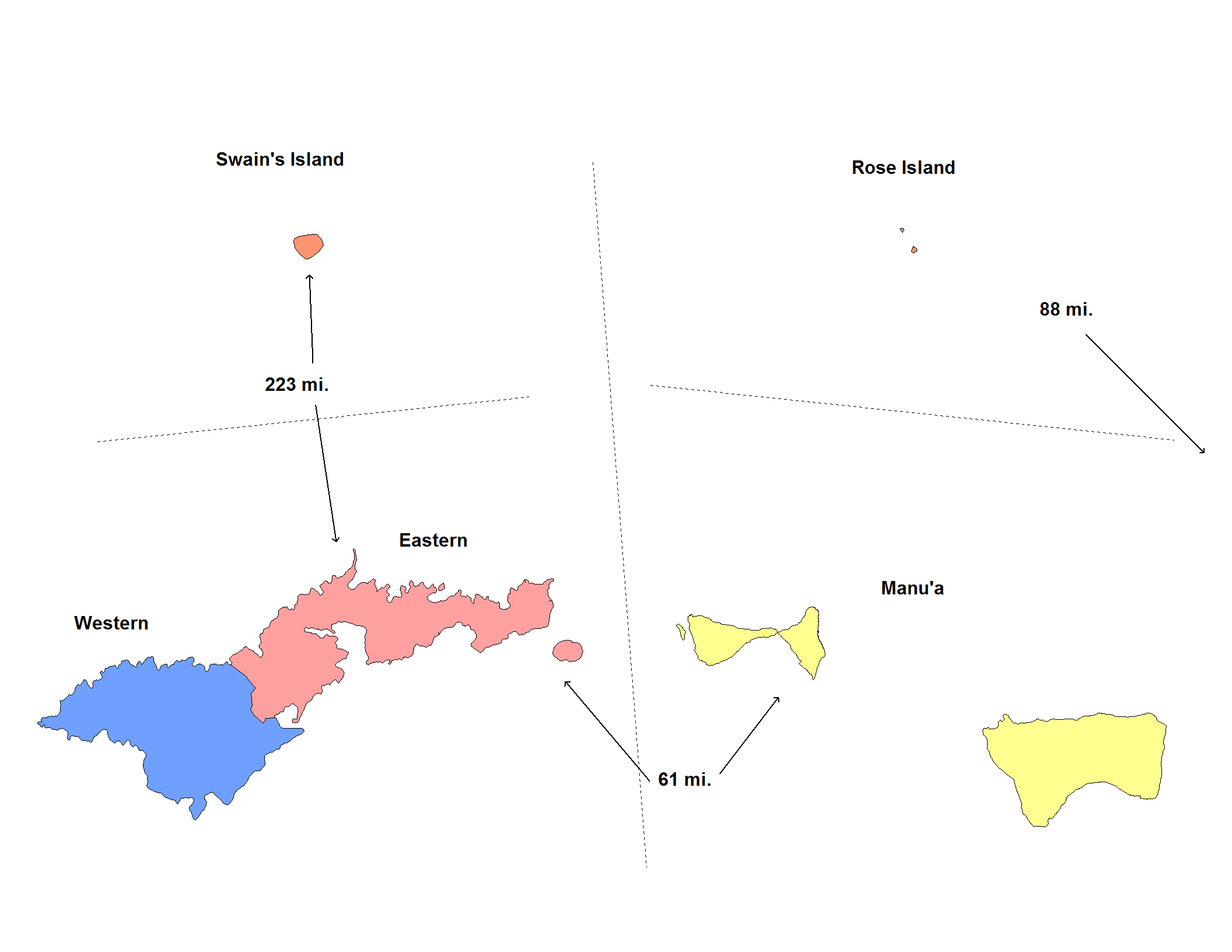
- The Eastern District of American Samoa is shown in red
- Country: United States
- Territory: American Samoa
- Island: Tutuila
- Named for: Falelima Sasa'e
- Largest city: Nuʻuuli

Government
  - District Governor: Alo Dr. Paul Stevenson

Area
  - Total: 25.14 sq mi (65.1 km^{2})

Population (2020)
  - Total: 17,059
  - Density: 678.6/sq mi (262.0/km^{2})
- Time zone: UTC−11 (Pacific Time Zone)
- ZIP code: 96799
- Area code: +1 684

The Eastern District is one of the primary districts of American Samoa. It consists of the eastern portion of Tutuila, American Samoa's largest island, plus the island of Aunu'u. The district has a land area of 67.027 km^{2} (25.879 sq mi) and a 2010 census population of 23,030. It contains 34 villages plus a portion of Nuʻuuli village. Among these are Pago Pago, Fagatogo, and Utulei.

In addition to the eastern half of Tutuila Island and the island of Aunu'u, the Eastern District encompasses several smaller islands, including Nuusetoga Island (Bartlett Island), Pola Island, Avagatatau Rock, Fatutoaga Rock, Tauga Rock, Manofa Rock, and Nuuosina Rock.

== District divisions ==
Eastern District is further divided into counties:

- Ituau County
- Ma'oputasi County
- Sa'Ole County
- Sua County
- Vaifanua County

== History ==
Historically, the cohesion of Sua ma Vaifanua, which later would become the Eastern District, was upheld by their unified high chief, Lei’ato, who lived in Fagaʻitua within Suʻa County. His residence, named Luafaga, was situated on the shared malae called Laloifileone.

In 1892, a civil war broke out in the Eastern District. Mauga Leilua (Talamaivao), who had lived on Upolu Island and supported Malietoa Laupepa, was previously exiled to the Marshall Islands by German authorities. After returning to Upolu in 1889, he soon came back to his native Tutuila, where the vacant Mauga title was conferred upon him by the matai of Pago Pago at Gagamoe. His dominant and authoritarian leadership style, however, created opposition, and villagers in Aua and Fagatogo sought to replace him with Manuma. This dispute escalated into the 1892 civil war known as the Taua o Sa ‘Ousoalii. To resolve the conflict, the United States and Germany dispatched warships to Pago Pago. A peace conference was arranged aboard one of the vessels, but neither Mauga would enter first. The standoff ended only when it was agreed that each would board from opposite sides of the ship. The conflict concluded when Mauga Leilua relinquished the title to Mauga Moi Moi and permanently returned to Upolu.

Already at the time of joining the union in 1900, Tutuila Island had well defined, traditional political divisions. The eastern part of Tutuila had five traditional “counties” grouped under the name “Sua ma Vaifanua.” American Samoa's first Governor, Commander B. F. Tilley, named this region the “Eastern District” and one of the area's chiefs was appointed as District Governor. Under the District Governor were five traditional counties within the district. Each of the counties contained several villages, and Governor B. F. Tilley selected a leading chief from each village and appointed him to be “Pulenuu” (mayor). All these appointments were based on recommendations Tilley had received in the specific counties and villages. The western part of the island had been known as Fofō and Aitulagi, but was renamed the “Western District” by Tilley.

In 1900, Mauga Moi Moi signed the Treaty of Cession of Tutuila, subsequently being appointed as the High Chief of Pago Pago. This position also designated him as the District Governor of the Eastern District. As the foremost chief in Pago Pago, Governor Benjamin Franklin Tilley extensively relied on Mauga Moi Moi’s leadership to secure Samoan support for the newly established U.S. administration. Mauga Moi Moi served as the District Governor of the Eastern District throughout the first thirty-five years of U.S. governance, from 1900 to 1935.

In 1920, Mauga Moi Moi initiated the Mau movement. Consequently, Governor Warren Terhune dismissed him from his position as District Governor of the Eastern District. In defiance of this removal, he continued to organize anti-U.S. Navy council meetings (fono) in Nuʻuuli, which subsequently became the new headquarters for the Mau movement. Following Governor Terhune’s suicide, several of his controversial laws were repealed, including the reinstatement of Mauga as District Governor.

When elder statesman Mauga Moi Moi died in 1935 at the age of 82, he left vacant not only his chiefly title but also the leadership of Maʻopūtasi County and the governorship of the Eastern District. Because the Mauga family could not agree on a successor, the Governor of American Samoa appointed High Chief Lei’ato as District Governor, though he hesitated to intrude upon the internal affairs of Maʻopūtasi County without the family’s consent. As a compromise, he introduced an experiment in free elections by secret ballot to choose the county chief. Aua declined to participate, while Fagatogo and Utulei voted for Mailo; the other villages each supported their own high chiefs. With no clear outcome, the Governor selected Mailo as, in his view, the most qualified. In 1940, however, when the Mauga family chose Sialega Palepoi as their matai, the chieftainship of Maʻopūtasi County passed to him in the traditional way.

It was the Eastern District which in 1935 brought a resolution that requested the establishment of a legislative body (Fono). The district's delegates elected Tuiasosopo Mariota to argue their case. Governor Otto Carl Dowling declined the request, claiming only the U.S. Congress had the right to establish such a legislature. High Talking Chief Tuiasosopo would become one of American Samoa's most prominent leaders in the mid-1940s. The Governor's decision was reversed by Governor Vernon Huber in 1948.

== Demographics ==
Historical population
Year	Pop.	±%
1900	2,221	—
1912	3,186	+43.4%
1920	3,777	+18.5%
1930	5,032	+33.2%
1940	6,733	+33.8%
1950	10,624	+57.8%
1960	11,137	+4.8%
1970	15,955	+43.3%
1980	17,311	+8.5%
1990	21,175	+22.3%
2000	23,441	+10.7%
2010	23,030	−1.8%
2020	17,059	−25.9%
U.S. Decennial Census

Eastern District of Tutuila was first recorded beginning with the 1900 U.S. Census. No census was taken in 1910, but a special census was taken in 1912. Regular decennial censuses were taken beginning in 1920.

Between the 2000 U.S. census and the 2010 U.S. census, the Eastern District's population decreased by 1.8 percent. Some counties, however, experienced population growth. These include Sa'Ole County, which experienced the district's highest population growth at 23.7 percent. Vaifanua County experienced a 13.2 percent population increase, while also Ituau County experienced population growth (8.4 percent). The largest population decline took place in Maoputasi County (-11.9%), where nearly all communities experienced a population decline, including American Samoa's capital area of Pago Pago and Fagatogo. Sua County also experienced population loss, although much lower at -2.8 percent.

== See also ==
- Manu'a District, American Samoa
- Western District, American Samoa
