= James H. Oliver =

James H. Oliver may refer to:

- James Harrison Oliver (1857-1928), American admiral
- James Henry Oliver (1905-1981), American classical scholar and epigrapher
