= Mau movement in American Samoa =

American Samoan independence movement

The Mau movement (Samoan: O le Mau), also called the Samoan Cause or the Samoan League, was an anti-colonial independence movement in American Samoa, established in late 1919 or early 1920, to challenge the U.S. Navy's authority.

The movement was launched by Mauga Moi Moi, the highest ranking chief in Pago Pago, after it was discovered that the U.S officials had misappropriated public funds. A boycott of copra, a critical revenue source of the U.S. Navy, was initiated in response.

The movement was declared over in 1935 after the death of Mauga Moi Moi.

== Origins ==
Opposition to the U.S. rule in Samoa predated 1920. After the eastern islands came under the U.S. authority, Samoans faced mistreatment towards chiefs and women and were paid less than the U.S. naval personnel.

In 1902, Tutuilans objected to a copra tax. Governor Uriel Sebree responded by imprisoning three local leaders and removing a Samoan judge who had complained to the U.S. Navy, and described Samoans as "grown-up children who love form and ceremony."

By 1904, chiefs from the Western and Eastern Districts held assemblies calling for the tax to be reduced and for an accounting of its use, and travelled together between Pago Pago and Leone to protest.

Governor Warren Terhune, in office from June 1919 to November 1920, faced widespread disapproval, and his administration and policies significantly contributed to the emergence of the Mau movement. A.M. Noble, an official in the Terhune administration, oversaw racially discriminatory policies in American Samoa during the 1920s. Samoans referred to him and two others in the administration as the "three white mice."

== Key figures ==
Some key figures of the Mau movement in American Samoa were:

- Samuel Sailele Ripley, leader of the movement. Deported, barred and exiled from American Samoa due to his involvement in the Mau movement. He later became the mayor of Richmond, California.
- Mauga Moi Moi, Pago Pago’s highest-ranking chief. Spurred by Mauga Moi Moi, the Mau movement came into being under his leadership. After his passing in 1935, Governor Otto Dowling claimed this was the end of the Mau movement.
- Magalei Siāsulu of Faleniu, one of the Mau movement’s leaders.
- Chris Taliutafa Young, descendent of Tui Manu'a Matelita and one of the Mau movement’s leaders.
- Ned Ripley, brother of Samuel Sailele Ripley, organized Mau meetings.
- Nelesoni Tuitele of Leone, testified in favor of the Mau movement and sided with Samuel Sailele Ripley and Arthur A. Greene. Nelsoni read Greene’s anti-administration articles into the record of the Bingham Commission’s hearings.
- Chief Soliai of Nuʻuuli.
- Chief Galea'i of Fitiua.
- Creed H. Boucher, Lieutenant Commander, executive officer of Governor Warren Terhune. Supported the movement and was arrested and deported.
- Arthur C. Kail, replaced Creed H. Boucher and was supportive of the Mau movement. Found guilty of abetting Creed H. Boucher in activities, which “bordered on sedition”.
- Madge A. Ripley, wife of Samuel Sailele Ripley. Wrote letters to First Lady Florence Harding and addressed women's clubs and organizations in California, encouraging their members to protest the U.S. Naval Administration's actions in Samoa.
- Lemafa, Chief of Aunuʻu Island
- Grace Pepe Malemo Haleck, nurse.
- Arthur A. Greene, editor for the Honolulu Star-Bulletin. Claimed the Mau movement invited him to be their legal counsel, but the U.S. Navy accused him of misinforming and misleading Samoans into unrest. After his deportation in November 1920, he wrote to Senator Reed Smoot and President Calvin Coolidge.
- High Chief Sātele Itulā of the Western District was removed from his role as district governor by Governor Warren Terhune. But he continued to arrange anti-U.S. Navy meetings in Nuʻuuli.

== Aims ==
The aims of the Mau movement included:

- Exposing financial exploitation.
- Restoring legislative authority to Samoan chiefs.
- Abolishing labor without compensation.
- Ending U.S. Navy rule and establishing a civilian government.
- Promoting cooperative governance between Samoans and Americans.
- Securing the release of imprisoned chiefs (the “Faleniu conspirators”).
- Repealing contentious laws, including those banning interracial marriages and malagas (organized inter-village visits).
- Challenging the U.S. Navy's copra monopoly.
- Organizing a copra boycott, effectively disabling the revenue-dependent U.S. naval administration.
- Opposing the revocation of chiefly titles.
- Questioning the legitimacy of U.S. Navy authority in Samoa.
- Ending perceived American exploitation of Samoans.
- Resisting the deportation and exile of Mau leader Samuel Sailele Ripley.
- Safeguarding Faʻa Sāmoa — including chiefly (matai) titles and ceremonial protocols — from external interference.
- Advocating for equal rights for both Samoans and Americans.
- Seeking unification of the Samoan Islands.
- Engaging in civil disobedience. In 1927, the Mau movement intensified its efforts by sending Governor Stephen Victor Graham a letter announcing that its members would no longer pay taxes until a civilian government—an outcome they strongly supported—was put in place. A number of matais were arrested for tax evasion.

== U.S. response ==
U.S. authorities responded to the Mau movement by enacting coercive measures and arresting certain Samoan leaders.

The Navy administration arrested Mau supporters, including Samuel Tulele Galea'i, Lieutenant Commander Creed Boucher, and 100 protesters in Pago Pago in 1922. Governor Waldo A. Evans charged seventeen men, called the "Faleniu conspirators," with conspiracy and rebellion. Several Mau advocates, including Samuel Sailele Ripley, Madge A. Ripley, Arthur A. Greene, Gretchen Falke Greene, and Boucher, were deported from American Samoa.

Travel between Tutuila and Upolu was restricted to prevent coordination with the Western Samoa Mau. The 1903 Malaga Regulation barred groups of more than eight from traveling between the islands without authorization.

In 1922, Governor E. T. Pollock sent a landing force of U.S. Marines from the USS Ontario to suppress a protest in Pago Pago. Governor Henry Francis Bryan banned malagas (organized travel between villages). Governor Warren Terhune sought to prohibit fono (councils), replaced Mauga Moi Moi and Sātele Itulā as district governors, and blamed the unrest on a Honolulu newspaper. The Navy accused the editor of the Honolulu Star-Bulletin of inciting protests and spreading misinformation. The Naval Administration also imposed martial law and used armed Fita Fita guards to suppress dissent among chiefs.

In 1930, the United States sent a committee to American Samoa that included Hawai'i residents who had earlier participated in the overthrow of Queen Lili'uokalani. The committee's report heavily supported the U.S position and the movement gradually lost momentum.
