= J. H. Oliver =

J. H. Oliver may refer to:

- James Harrison Oliver (1857-1928), American admiral
- James Henry Oliver (1905-1981), American classical scholar and epigrapher
