= Moimoi =

Moimoi may refer to

- Moin moin, a Yoruba steamed bean pudding
- Fuifui Moimoi (born 1979), Tongan rugby league footballer
- Mauga Moimoi, American Samoan paramount Aliʻi, district governor, and signer of the Deed of Cession of Tutuila
