= Faleniu, American Samoa =

Faleniu
- Village
- Location within American Samoa
- Coordinates: 14°19′57″S 170°44′40″W
- Country: United States
- Territory: American Samoa
- County: Tuālāuta

Area
  - Total: 0.27 sq mi (0.69 km^{2})
- Elevation: 167 ft (51 m)

Population (2020)
  - Total: 1,953
  - Density: 7,741.2/sq mi (2,988.9/km^{2})
- Time zone: UTC−11 (Samoa Time Zone)
- ZIP code: 96799
- Area code: +1 684

Faleniu is a village in the west of Tutuila Island, American Samoa. It is located inland from the village of Tafuna, in Tuālāuta County. Its name translates to "the home in the palm grove." Another translation is "House of coconuts".

In the 1920s, Faleniu was a center for the Mau movement. The U.S. Navy deployed armed Fita Fita guards to suppress chiefs, arresting the “Faleniu 17” (“The Faleniu conspirators”). The 17 matai were tried in Pago Pago, resulting in prison sentences and stripped titles, violating cession treaties protecting Faʻa Sāmoa.

As of 2010, Faleniu had a 61.7 percent high school graduation rate, which was the lowest of any village in American Samoa. Also in 2010, Faleniu was the most densely populated village in American Samoa at 7,741.2 people per square mile (20,050 people/km^{2}).

== History ==
Excavations at Faleniu (AS-31-131) have revealed a substantial array of terraces, walls, and other structural remains dating back roughly 2000 BCE. Early settlers endured an inhospitable landscape dominated by lava fields and ongoing volcanic activity, as evidenced by a distinct red ash layer capping ceramic-bearing deposits. This layer offers a key chronological benchmark, with signs of human occupation both before and after its deposition. Its presence, along with other features such as mounds and stone enclosures, points to an enduring community that adapted to changing conditions. Radiocarbon dates place this pivotal volcanic event around 240–640 AD, marking centuries of continued habitation and environmental negotiation. Artifacts found at the site—particularly decorated pottery and shell bracelets—indicate cultural links to the Ancestral Polynesian Society. These finely crafted items, frequently incised and intricately shaped, reflect both the artistry and cultural practices of the Samoan people. The inland location of Faleniu, combined with its extensive terraces and stone constructions, suggests a deliberate strategic shift away from coastal areas, possibly in response to scarce resources or ecological pressures. Such developments often underscore an understanding of land use, social organization, and possibly ceremonial functions that extended well beyond mere survival.

In the early 1920s, Faleniu played an important role in the history of the Mau movement. On July 26, 1921, Governor Waldo A. Evans convened a meeting of high chiefs and talking chiefs to assess their satisfaction with the U.S. Naval Administration. The chiefs responded the next day with a letter to the U.S. president, signed by prominent leaders such as Satele, Tufele, Mauga, Tuitele, Pele, and Leoso. The letter expressed their contentment with the administration and dismissed claims made by Samuel Sailele Ripley, the leader of the Mau movement. However, this decision sparked significant dissent. Later that month, dissenting matai (chiefs) assembled at Faleniu to voice their objections. The gathering, attended by over 340 Samoans, included a protest against High Chief Letuli, who had reversed his position and abandoned the Mau cause. This meeting escalated into a tense and volatile situation, with death threats against High Chief Letuli and other leaders.

Governor Waldo A. Evans, informed of the unrest, dispatched Chief of Police Hunkin to investigate. Upon arriving in Faleniu, Hunkin found the village deserted but learned from a Mormon missionary that the surrounding woods were filled with armed men. In response, Governor Evans sent a posse led by Lieutenant W.A. McDonald of the U.S. Navy, resulting in the arrest of 17 matai accused of conspiracy and rebellion. Sixteen of the “Faleniu conspirators” confessed and were convicted, receiving prison sentences ranging from 7.5 to 12 years and losing their matai titles. Just weeks later, on August 16, 1921, the day after Samuel S. Ripley was deported for his involvement in the Mau movement, Mau supporters regrouped again secretly in Faleniu. They gathered to express their discontent and betrayal, particularly toward High Chief Letuli, who had shifted his allegiance and ordered them to abandon the cause.

During the early 20th century, the Latter-day Saints' land in Faleniu became a focal point for the LDS Church's efforts to establish a 'gathering to Zion' on U.S. territory in the Pacific. In April 1910, the Mormon mission, acting on behalf of Mapusaga (then home to 128 people), requested that Faleniu and Mapusaga be split into two separate villages, each with its own mayor and magistrate. Faleniu opposed the proposal, noting that students at Mapusaga's school came from across the Samoan Islands and were only in Faleniu temporarily. Furthermore, Mapusaga had no matais, and the role of mayor required a matai. In the end, the request for separation was denied, and Mapusaga remained a locality within the village of Faleniu.

== Demographics ==
Year	Population
2020	1,953
2010	1,898
2000	2,056
1990	833
1980	544
