= Arthur A. Greene =

American lawyer (1876–1936)

Arthur A. Greene (September 22, 1876 – May 9, 1936) was an American lawyer, journalist, and Democratic Party politician. He served as Secretary of the Territory of Hawaii under Governor Joseph Poindexter and as editor for both the Honolulu Star-Bulletin and The Honolulu Advertiser. In the early 1920s, Greene was the attorney for the Mau movement in American Samoa, for which he was imprisoned and deported from the territory.

== Early life ==
Greene was born in Topeka, Kansas, in 1880. His father, Colonel R. Greene, was prominent in Kansas state politics. Greene was also the brother-in-law of Kansas Supreme Court Justice Henry F. Mason. Shortly after relocating to Honolulu, Hawai'i, in 1919, Greene met and married a Samoan woman who had been educated in Europe and was an accomplished pianist. Her father, a Samoan chief, owned a large coconut plantation in Samoa and asked Greene to assist in its management.

== Career ==
Between 1902 and 1913, Greene served on the reportorial staffs of the Topeka Herald, the Portland Oregonian, The San Francisco Call, and The New York Globe. From 1913 to 1916, he was the business manager for actor Robert Mantell, and in 1916, he became publicity director for the Balboa Picture Corporation in Los Angeles. During World War I, he trained at the Officer's Training Camp at Camp Pike in Arkansas. After the war, he moved to Hawai‘i in 1919 and became city editor of the Honolulu Star-Bulletin.

Trained as a lawyer and a veteran of the Spanish-American War, Greene also pursued a career in journalism. At various times, he served as city editor for both the Honolulu Star-Bulletin and The Honolulu Advertiser. He was also employed by the Pacific Commercial Advertiser in 1921, serving as city editor and editorial writer.

In the 1920s, Greene served as legal counsel for the Mau movement in American Samoa and also worked with Samuel Sailele Ripley and the Ripley family to obtain approval for a land development project in Leone. Governor Waldo A. Evans later traced the origin of the Mau movement to April 1920, linking it to Greene’s arrival in American Samoa on March 31. Under the unpopular Governor Warren Terhune, Greene was accused of leading the Mau movement and subsequently imprisoned. When a new governor took office, Greene and his wife, Gretchen, were deported. They then returned to Hawai'i, where he served as manager of the Princess Theater in Honolulu.

In 1934, President Franklin D. Roosevelt appointed Greene as Secretary of the Territory of Hawaii. When Governor Joseph B. Poindexter was away, Greene served as Acting Governor of the Territory.

== Mau movement ==
Greene's wife, Gretchen, was a niece of Samuel Sailele Ripley. On March 31, 1920, Greene and his wife, Gretchen, arrived on Tutuila Island in American Samoa to assist Samuel S. Ripley. Greene's reports critical of the local government soon drew off-island attention. He supported Commander Creed H. Boucher, the executive officer to Governor Warren Terhune, who was later found guilty of subversive activities and sent back to the United States. Greene launched a letter-writing campaign to members of the U.S. Congress, accusing Governor Terhune of approving the embezzlement of government funds by officers. He also contended that treaties between the United States and the Samoan people permitted only the use of Pago Pago Bay and did not authorize broader U.S. authority. As a result, he challenged both the U.S. Navy's administration in American Samoa and the very scope of American sovereignty there.

Greene maintained that the United States held authority solely over the territory it had purchased and occupied, granting it no right to enforce laws across the rest of Tutuila Island or the Manuʻa Islands. He therefore argued that the U.S. Navy-appointed Governor had no legal grounds to interfere with the Ripley family's development project in Leone. Greene recalled that upon becoming counsel to the Mau movement, he advised drafting a formal bill of complaints for submission to Governor Terhune. However, he was informed that such a bill had already been filed—and subsequently ignored.

On November 31, 1920, a U.S. Naval Court of Inquiry ordered Greene's deportation from American Samoa, holding both him and Commander Creed H. Boucher responsible for stirring unrest that allegedly drove Governor Terhune to take his own life. Upon his return to Hawaiʻi on December 20, 1920, Greene described events in American Samoa as “the most astonishing travesty of justice I ever saw.” Greene explicitly denied any role in organizing the Mau movement. Greene maintained that the Mau movement had invited him to serve as their legal counsel, but the United States Navy accused him of misinforming and misleading Samoans into unrest. After his deportation, Greene wrote to Senator Reed Smoot, published articles in Honolulu newspapers outlining his views, and summarized his position in a letter to President Calvin Coolidge.

A decade after his deportation from American Samoa, Greene presented his views in a paper prepared for the Samoan Civic Association. He opposed governmental interference by local chiefs, the alienation of land, and miscegenation, and advocated for the exclusion of undesirable labor undesirable and white individuals. Greene recommended establishing a civil government comprising an American governor and judge, a Samoan vice governor and sheriff, and a mixed-race treasurer.

== Bibliography ==
- Chapell, David A (2000). "The Forgotten Mau: Anti-Navy Protest in American Samoa, 1920–1935". Pacific Historical Review. 69 (2). ISSN 0030-8684.
- Gray, John Alexander Clinton (1960). Amerika Samoa: A History of American Samoa and its United States Naval Administration. United States Naval Institute. ISBN 9780870210747.
- Sunia, Fofō Iosefa Fiti (2001). Puputoa: Host of Heroes - A record of the history makers in the First Century of American Samoa, 1900-2000. Suva, Fiji: Oceania Printers. ISBN 9829036022.
