= Edwin Pollock =

Edwin Pollock may refer to:

- Edwin Taylor Pollock (1870–1943), U.S. Navy officer
- Edwin A. Pollock (1899–1982), U.S. Marine Corps general
