= Tony Solaita =

American Samoan baseball player (1947–1990)

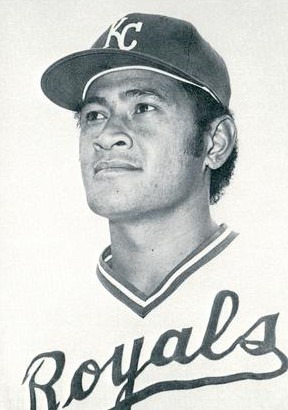
- First baseman
- Born: January 15, 1947; Nuʻuuli, American Samoa
- Died: February 10, 1990 (aged 43); Tafuna, American Samoa
- Batted: Left Threw: Left

Professional debut
- MLB: September 16, 1968, for the New York Yankees
- NPB: April 5, 1980, for the Nippon-Ham Fighters

Last appearance
- MLB: September 30, 1979, for the Toronto Blue Jays
- NPB: October 20, 1983, for the Nippon-Ham Fighters

MLB statistics
- Batting average: .255
- Home runs: 50
- Runs batted in: 203

NPB statistics
- Batting average: .268
- Home runs: 155
- Runs batted in: 371
- Stats at Baseball Reference

Teams
- New York Yankees (1968); Kansas City Royals (1974–1976); California Angels (1976–1978); Montreal Expos (1979); Toronto Blue Jays (1979); Nippon-Ham Fighters (1980–1983)

Tolia "Tony" Solaita (/soʊˈliːtə/ soh-LEE-tə; January 15, 1947 – February 10, 1990) was an American first baseman in Major League Baseball. He played for the New York Yankees, Kansas City Royals, California Angels, Toronto Blue Jays and Montreal Expos between 1968 and 1979. He also played four seasons in Japan for the Nippon-Ham Fighters from 1980 to 1983.

As of 2024, Solaita is still both the only Major League Baseball player to have been born in American Samoa and the only one to die there. Mike Fetters, Benny Agbayani, Chris Aguila, Matt Tuiasosopo, Wes Littleton, and Sean Manaea are American-born major-leaguers of partial Samoan descent.

== Professional baseball career ==
Solaita was a prolific home run hitter in the minor leagues, hitting 49 regular-season home runs in 1968 for High Point-Thomasville, but was mostly relegated to a backup or platoon position during his Major League playing days. He was selected by the Royals from the Charleston Charlies in the Rule 5 draft on December 3, 1973. In 1975, while playing for the Royals, he hit 16 home runs in 231 at-bats, second to only Dave Kingman in home run to at-bat ratio.

After becoming a free agent following the 1979 season, Solaita opted for a four-year contract in the Japanese League, where he was designated hitter for the Nippon-Ham Fighters and averaged nearly 40 home runs a year. Solaita retired after the 1983 season. As of 2023, Solaita holds the Fighters' franchise single season home run record, hitting 45 in his first season with the club, 1980.

In 525 games over seven seasons, Solaita posted a .255 batting average (336-for-1316) with 164 runs, 50 home runs, 203 RBI and 214 bases on balls. Defensively, he recorded a .993 fielding percentage as a first baseman.

He was murdered in Tafuna, American Samoa on February 10, 1990. He was shot in a dispute over a land transaction.

== Background ==
He became the first Samoan MLB player in the United States. He played for the Kansas City Royals, Montreal Expos, New York Yankees, California Angels, Toronto Blue Jays, and also played in Japan for a number of seasons. He was a charter member of the Little League of American Samoa.

== Death ==
In 1990, he was killed by a family member over a land dispute in Tafuna. He was married to Fagaoalii Atuatasi, and together, they had five children.
