= Freddie Letuli =

American judge

Freddie Letuli (April 30, 1919 as Uluao Letuli Misilagi in the village of Nuʻuuli in American Samoa – 2003) originated the fire knife dance in 1946 at the Golden Gate Park in San Francisco, previously dancing in Hawaii and Los Angeles with two knives. Along with performing, Freddie was also a teacher to the early fire knife dancers.

Dating back from the 1940s to the 1960s, Freddie Letuli performed throughout the US and Europe with his dance troupes formerly known as "Freddie Letuli and the Flaming Sword of Samoa, showcasing his talents and his island. Additional dance troupes (such as the Samoan Warriors, Freddie Letuli and his Wild Polynesians, Freddie Letuli and the Samoans, and Freddie Letuli and the Hawaiians) were formed to fill his contracts and to keep up with the demand for the Polynesian shows. They performed regularly at various venues in Las Vegas, Los Angeles, San Francisco, Lake Tahoe, Reno, Italy, Chicago, Kentucky, Washington, Australia, and New York.

Freddie's great talents and expertise got him on movies like Pagan Love Song, the 1953 Rita Hayworth film Salome, and Sailor Beware. Aside from other movies, he was also seen on television shows and had recurring roles on Adventures in Paradise and The Bob Cummings Show.

With the urging of Governor H. Rex Lee, Freddie returned home to American Samoa where he joined the Department of Education and taught numerous school children the art of Polynesian dancing.

Freddie Letuli served as Assistant Director of Tourism, and later served as a Senator in the Legislature of American Samoa, and as an Associate Judge in the High Court of American Samoa. Letuli held the High Talking Chief title of "Olo" for 40 years. In 2001, he was bestowed as the Paramount Chief title of "Letuli", becoming one of only five Paramount Chiefs in American Samoa.

Freddie died in Honolulu, Hawaii in 2003.

== The History of the Samoan Fireknife Dance ==
as told by P.C. Letuli Olo Misilagi

In 1946 at Golden Gate Park in San Francisco, I started the fireknife dance of Samoa. I was intrigued by a Hindu fire eater and a young girl twirling her baton fitted with light bulbs on either end. All of us were rehearsing our particular talents to perform for the Shriner's Convention.

I asked the Hindu man for some of his white gas, and I wrapped a towel around the blade of my knife. While not perfect, the Flaming Sword of Samoa became a reality.

Many people helped me and advised me on the materials to use to hold the fire to my knives and, in turn, I did my best to perfect the fire knife and to pass this talent on to others.

I did not dream that the fire knife dance would become so widespread, nor that so many people with such diverse backgrounds would pursue the Samoan Fire Knife Dance.

I thank Pulefano Galea'i and the people at the Polynesian Cultural Center in Laie, Hawaii for hosting the World Fire Knife Competition every year. I also thank Lene Leota and the Ailao Club from the Independent State of Samoa for hosting the annual Fire Knife Competition in Samoa. Finally, my heartfelt thanks to Flaming Sword of Samoa for bringing the World Fire Knife Competition home to American Samoa.
