= Grace Pepe Malemo Haleck =

American Samoan nurse

- Born: Grace Pepe Malemo; 11 January 1894; Manu’a island group, American Samoa
- Died: 30 August 1987 (aged 93); Fagaʻalu, Tutuila, American Samoa
- Occupation: Chief nurse of American Samoa
- Spouse: Max Haleck

Grace Pepe Malemo Haleck (1894–1987), from American Samoa, was the first nurse in that territory to receive training in the USA. She became American Samoa's chief nurse in 1926.

== Early life ==
Grace Pepe Malemo was born at Olesega on the Manu'a island group of American Samoa on 11 January 1894. Her father was a church minister from Olosega and her mother was from a well-known family from the same island group. She had seven sisters and four brothers. As a child, she was raised by her grandmother. In 1906, she was sponsored by Charles Brainard Taylor Moore, then governor of American Samoa, to attend the Church girls' school on Tutuila, the main island of the territory. She completed her studies in 1913 and in 1914 she and two other girls from the same school became the first Samoan women to enter nurses' training. They graduated in 1916, becoming the first American Samoans to qualify as nurses.

== Career ==
Standing only 5 feet (1.5 m) tall, Haleck walked alone over mountain tracks carrying just a bag filled with medicine and medical records. She was reportedly very charismatic and intent on getting her own way in her dealings with the health authorities. In the villages she visited, elephantiasis and yaws were common diseases and malnutrition widespread. She delivered many babies.

In 1919, Haleck was the first American Samoan nurse to be sent for training in the United States. She went first to the Naval Hospital on Mare Island, California, and then to a Children's Hospital in San Francisco. In 1926, she became the first Samoan to be Chief Nurse in American Samoa. In 1928 she was appointed by the administration as Samoa's delegate as one of the 173 participants at the first conference of the Pan Pacific Women's Association, held in Hawaii. The Pacific region's first independent international women's organization was designed to promote peace, in response to World War I. In 1955, the name was changed to the Pan-Pacific & Southeast Asia Women's Association (PPSEAWA).

== Personal life ==
A popular song in American Samoa was composed about her by a student who she declined to marry because she did not want to give up her nursing training. After 22 years of nursing, she married Max Haleck, a businessman from Germany who owned the Rainmaker Hotel in the capital Pago Pago, and gave up her job. Haleck was a widower with six children. Among the visitors to the hotel was the anthropologist, Margaret Mead, author of Coming of Age in Samoa. Pepe Haleck acted as her interpreter. However, her interest in nursing continued. In 1937 she founded the Nurses' Alumni Association and became its first president. In 1957, nurses in American Samoa went on strike and Peter Tali Coleman, the first Samoan governor, enlisted her help to persuade them to return to work. She also organized several other women's associations.

== Death ==
Grace Pepe Malemo Haleck died on 30 August 1987, in Fagaʻalu on Tutuila island.
