= Otto Dowling =

United States naval officer (1881-1946)

Otto Carl Dowling

Governor of American Samoa
- In office April 17, 1934 – January 15, 1936
- Preceded by: Thomas Latimore
- Succeeded by: Thomas Benjamin Fitzpatrick

Personal details
- Born: February 28, 1881
- Died: 14 April 1946 (aged 65) Trumbull, Connecticut
- Spouse: Ora Dowling
- Education: United States Naval Academy
- Occupation: Naval officer
- Awards: Distinguished Service Cross

Military service
- Allegiance: United States
- Branch/service: United States Navy
- Rank: Captain
- Commands: Naval arsenal at Iona Island; Lake Denmark Powder Depot

Otto Carl Dowling (February 28, 1881 – April 14, 1946) was a United States Navy Captain, and the governor of American Samoa from April 17, 1934, to January 15, 1936. He graduated from the United States Naval Academy in 1903. Dowling served in World War I, before retiring. He was re-commissioned in World War II, serving as the commander of a naval ammunition depot on Iona Island in New York. He commanded the Lake Denmark Powder Depot, and was in charge when lightning struck the location, causing a large explosion of millions of dollars' worth of ammunition. A board of inquiry recommended him for the Distinguished Service Cross for his bravery in the situation.

He was Governor of American Samoa from 1934 to 1936. As Governor, he discriminated against the Samoan people, believing they had little ability to plan or administer, and were generally lazy. He abandoned a project on the island to train people in agricultural and sawmill skills. He shut down some local occupational training facilities, and outlawed the sale of alcohol to men under 18, and to all women.

Governor Dowling denied a resolution from the Eastern District that sought to establish a legislative assembly known as the Fono. However, this request was later approved by Governor Vernon Huber.

== Naval career ==
Dowling attended the United States Naval Academy from New York, beginning in 1898 and graduating in 1903. Dowling served in both World War I, where he obtained his Captain rank. Soon after the war, he retired from the United States Navy, but returned to active duty in World War II, and was placed in command of the Naval arsenal on Iona Island. He served as the senior member of the Naval Alaskan Coal Commission.

He was in charge of the Lake Denmark Powder Depot when an explosion occurred there in 1926. Both Dowling and a United States Marine Corps Private First Class were caught in the blast. Dowling was temporarily blinded, badly burned, and used a wheelchair for a time afterward. For his bravery during the situation, Dowling was awarded the Distinguished Service Cross.

== Governorship ==
Dowling was Governor of American Samoa from April 17, 1934, to January 15, 1936. Dowling's administration continued certain policies of racism toward the native Samoans, who he believed had little work ethic or ability to plan for the future; as such, he treated the Samoan race as a people who needed safety nets. Dowling claimed, "Our policy of Samoa for the Samoans—no alienation of lands and no exploitation of natives—has been rigidly adhered to... as such a policy assures the existence of the Samoan race which otherwise could not stand competition from the energetic races." Dowling viewed the slow adoption of the English language after thirty-five years of occupation to be troublesome.

Dowling outlawed the sale of alcohol to all men below the age of eighteen, and to all women on the island. When asked if he would approve the formation of a legislative body for the island, he claimed that such a thing would require an act of the United States Congress; this stance was reversed when Governor Vernon Huber approved the American Samoa Fono.

== Death ==
Dowling died on April 14, 1946, in Trumbull, Connecticut. He was driving a car on Merritt Parkway when he had a heart attack; Dowling successfully pulled the car to the side of the road, but died a few minutes later. At the time of his death, he had been living in Pelham, New York.
