= James Henry Oliver =

American ancient historian and epigrapher (1905–1981)

James Henry Oliver (26 April 1905 – 3 April 1981) was an American ancient historian and epigrapher, especially notable for his work on Ancient Athens.

== Life ==
Oliver was born on 26 April 1905 in New York City to James Henry Oliver and Louise McGratty. He completed his undergraduate studies at Yale in 1926 and his doctoral studies at the same university in 1931. His doctoral supervisors were George Lincoln Henderson and Michael Rostovtzeff. He was a visiting student at the University of Bonn for one year (1927/28) and the American Academy in Rome as Jesse R. Carter fellow 1928–30. After his doctorate, he taught at Yale and then served as field epigrapher for the excavations of the Athenian Agora being carried out by the American School of Classical Studies at Athens from 1932 to 1936.

In 1936, Oliver was appointed assistant professor of history at Columbia University and became a member of the managing committee of the American School at Athens in 1938. He enlisted in the American army during World War II and was promoted to the rank of major. After he was discharged from the army in 1946, he was appointed Professor of Classics at Johns Hopkins University, where he was promoted to Francis White Professor of Greek in 1957. He became a member of the American School's publications committee in 1952 and an editor of American Journal of Philology. He was a senior fellow of the Center for Hellenic Studies from 1962 to 1971. He retired in 1970. He was president of the American Philological Association for 1973/74.

Oliver's chief academic interest was the Greek East under the Roman Empire, especially in Athens. He studied this topic through literature, with book length studies on the Roman Oration and the Panathenaic Discourse of Aelius Aristides, and also through inscriptions, especially at Athens, where he was responsible for the first publication of hundreds of inscriptions from the Athenian Agora excavations. One assessment of his work held that:

From the preparation of Greek inscriptions... and papyri, to the editing and annotating of Classical authors... to the analyses of religious and political antiquities of Greece and Rome... the hallmarks of Oliver's work are the same: meticulous collection, careful scrutiny and balanced interpretation of the evidence

— Clinton, Geagan & Swift 1979

He married Janet Carnochan in Athens on 26 June 1936, and died in Baltimore on 3 April 1981.

== Selected publications ==
- Oliver, James Henry (1941). The Sacred Gerusia (The American Excavations in the Athenian Agora: Hesperia, Suppl. VI.). Athens: American School of Classical Studies at Athens.
- Oliver, James Henry (1950). The Athenian Expounders of the Sacred and Ancestral Law. Johns Hopkins Press. ISBN 978-0-598-76886-5.
- Oliver, James Henry (1953). "The Ruling Power: A Study of the Roman Empire in the Second Century after Christ through the Roman Oration of Aelius Aristides" (PDF). Transactions of the American Philosophical Society. 43 (4). American Philosophical Society: 871–1003. doi:10.2307/1005702. JSTOR 1005702.
- Oliver, James Henry (1968). The Civilizing Power: A Study of the Panathenaic Discourse of Aelius Aristides Against the Background of Literature and Cultural Conflict, with Text, Translation, and Commentary. American Philosophical Society. ISBN 978-0-87169-581-9.
- Oliver, James Henry (1970). Marcus Aurelius: Aspects of Civic and Cultural Policy in the East. Athens: American School of Classical Studies at Athens. ISBN 978-0-87661-513-3.
- Oliver, James Henry (1983). The Civic Tradition and Roman Athens. Johns Hopkins University Press. ISBN 978-0-8018-2718-1.
- Oliver, James Henry; Clinton, Kevin (1989). Greek Constitutions of Early Roman Emperors from Inscriptions and Papyri. American Philosophical Society. ISBN 978-0-87169-178-1.

== Bibliography ==
- Clinton, Kevin; Geagan, Daniel J.; Swift, Louis J. (1979). "Introduction". The American Journal of Philology. 100 (1): iii–viii. ISSN 0002-9475. JSTOR 294219.
- Briggs Jr., W. D. (1994). Biographical Dictionary of American Classicists. Westport, Connecticut. pp. 461–462.
- Poultney, James W. "Oliver, James Henry". dbcs.rutgers.edu.
