= James Harrison Oliver =

American admiral (1857–1928)

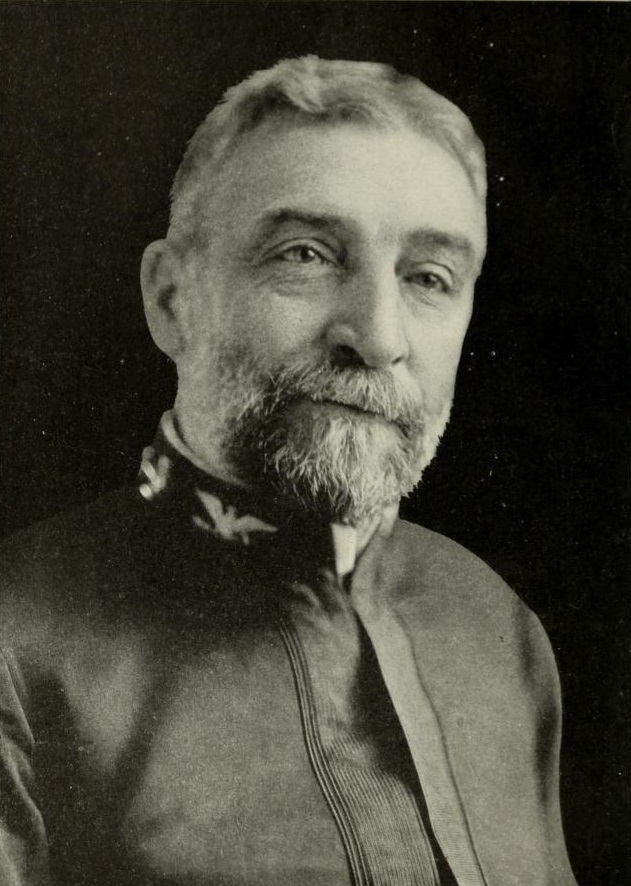
- Born: 1857; Houston County, Georgia, U.S.
- Died: 6 April 1928 (aged 70–71); Shirley Plantation, Virginia, U.S.
- Military career
- Allegiance: United States
- Branch: United States Navy
- Service years: 1877–1921
- Rank: Rear Admiral
- Commands: USS Culgoa
- Conflicts: World War I
- Awards: Navy Cross

James Harrison Oliver (1857 – April 6, 1928) was a rear admiral and member of the Naval Board of Strategy in World War I. He was the first military governor of the United States Virgin Islands from 1917 to 1919. He was often referred to as J. H. Oliver.

== Biography ==
Oliver was born in Houston County, Georgia. He graduated from Washington and Lee University in 1872 and the United States Naval Academy in 1877. In 1893, he moved to Shirley Plantation in Charles City, Virginia, where he married and established his lifelong residence, returning there whenever he was not serving in the navy.

== Resignation from the navy ==
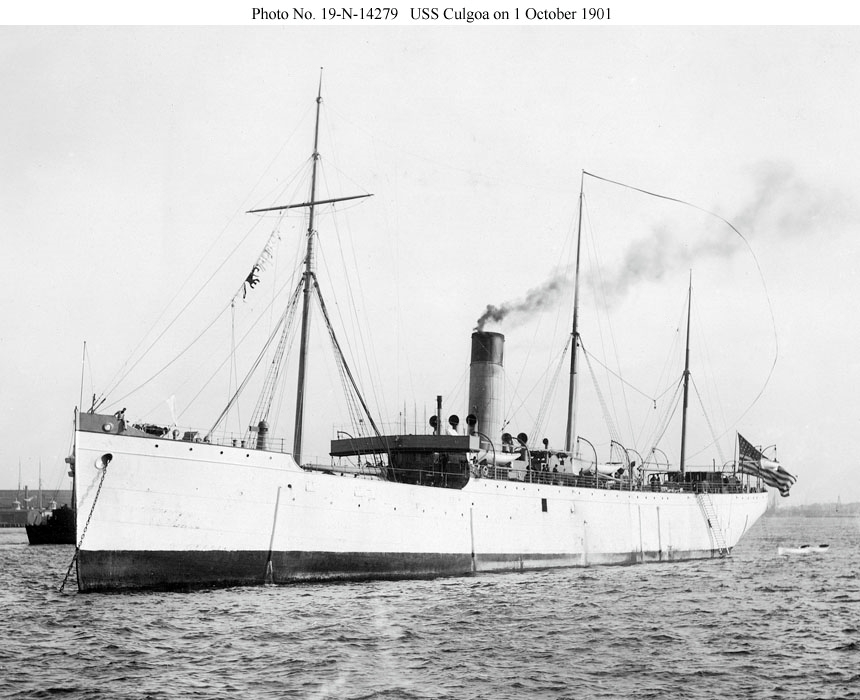
USS Culgoa in 1901

In October 1904, as a Lieutenant Commander, he was put in command of USS Culgoa. On the evening of 9 November, off the coast of New Jersey, Culgoa collided with the schooner Wilson and Hunting: capsizing the schooner, and causing the deaths of four of the people aboard her. Oliver was arrested and charged, but his court-martial was delayed for more than a year, during which time he remained in command of his ship, despite being technically under arrest. (In Navy tradition, he had also been stripped of his sword, a humiliating gesture.) He was eventually acquitted "with honor". At the ceremony where his sword was officially returned, Oliver broke the sword and threw it into the ocean, then immediately resigned from the navy. In his retirement, he briefly served as inspector of the Fourteenth Lighthouse District in Cincinnati, Ohio. In 1906, President Theodore Roosevelt reinstated his commission, reportedly saying, (with respect to his resignation) "I'd have done the same thing myself." Upon reinstatement, he was simultaneously promoted to Commander.

He was promoted to captain in 1910 and rear admiral in 1916, just prior to the United States entrance into World War I. He was subsequently elevated to Chief of Naval Intelligence by 1917.

== Governor of the U.S. Virgin Islands ==
On March 28, 1917, he was appointed as Governor of the United States Virgin Islands by President Woodrow Wilson. (Edwin Taylor Pollock was made acting governor until his arrival.) He held the position for two years, until 1919. He was awarded the Navy Cross for his service as governor.

The US government promptly granted him a loan of $200,000 ($3.4 million, adjusted for inflation) to cover occupation expenses, including building fortifications and stationing troops on the island. Dissatisfied with the quality of local educators, Oliver also requested additional instructors from the mainland.

From 1919 until the end of the war, he served on the Naval Board of Strategy. Oliver retired from the Navy in January 1921. He died of heart disease in 1928 at his home in Virginia.

== Sources ==
- "Orders to Naval Officers". The Washington Post. July 27, 1905. p. 7. (Announcing his retirement / resignation.)
- "Orders to Naval Officers". The Washington Post. September 23, 1905. p. 4. (Appointment as inspector, listed as retired.)
- "Army Orders". The Washington Post. August 7, 1906. p. 3. (Appointment as Commander.)
- "Oliver to Govern our New Islands". The New York Times. March 29, 1917. p. 12.
- "Under The Stars And Stripes The Virgin Islands Are A Disappointment To The Natives". Current Opinion. LXIV (2). New York City: 152–153. February 1918.
- "$200,000 For Virgin Islands.; Wilson Authorizes Gov. Oliver To Spend Sum "In His Discretion."". The Washington Post. July 28, 1918. p. ES4.
- "Admiral J.H. Oliver Is Dead In Virginia". The New York Times. April 7, 1928. p. 11.
- "Admiral Oliver, Who Broke Sword and Resigned, Dies". The Washington Post. April 7, 1928. p. 1.
- "Oliver Laid To Rest While Guns Salute". The Atlanta Constitution. April 8, 1928. p. 17A.

Preceded by Edwin Taylor Pollock	Governor of the U.S. Virgin Islands; 1917–1919	Succeeded by Joseph Wallace Oman
