= Mauga Moi Moi =

Mauga Moimoi (1852–1935) was a statesman and paramount Aliʻi, the highest ranking chief of Pago Pago, and signatory of the Deed of Cession. In 1920, he initiated the Mau movement in 1920 and in 1900, he signed the Deed of Cession and became a District Governor under the new U.S. naval station. He was the High Chief of Pago Pago from 1900 to 1934 and therefore also the District Governor of the Eastern District according to U.S. Naval rule.

Governor Benjamin Franklin Tilley relied heavily on his leadership in 1900 to secure Samoan support for the new American administration. He served as the Eastern District's first District Governor for 35 years under the new U.S. territorial rule. In 1920, he initiated the Mau movement and demanded a civil administration and an end to U.S. Navy rule. Governor Warren Terhune removed him from office, citing alleged support for the Mau movement, although it has later been suggested that he was merely outspoken rather than an actual supporter. Ultimately, he was reinstated and remained in the post until his death in 1935.

In 1902, tensions flared between Tutuila Island and the Manuʻa Islands during his official inspection of Ofu Island. Mauga Moimoi refused to receive his ‘ava cup unless it was heralded by the term “ipu,” traditionally reserved for the Tui Manu'a’s ‘ava. Claiming equal sovereignty, Mauga insisted on this honor. The matais of Ofu Island eventually struck a compromise, designating “ipu” for his role as District Governor rather than for being a Mauga. This appeased Mauga Moimoi but displeased the Tui Manu'a, who retaliated by exiling the Ofu matais from the Manu’a Islands. E.W. Gurr arrived in the Manu’a Islands at the same time to preside over court proceedings, thereby preventing the imposed punishment.

In 1930, Mauga Moimoi distinguished himself as a member of the Bingham Commission when, during its final session, he delivered a lengthy statement attributing many issues to “the activities of irresponsible white men, both Naval and civilian.” He also recounted the history of the U.S. Naval administration and described how Governor Warren Terhune had disregarded his advice — just before Terhune removed him from his District Governor role.

When Mauga Moimoi died in 1935, Governor Otto Dowling remarked that the Mau movement had ended.
