= Warren Terhune =

US Navy officer and 13th Governor of American Samoa (1919–1920)

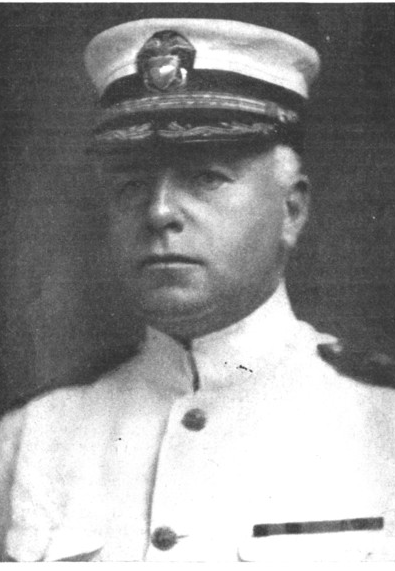

Governor of American Samoa
- In office June 10, 1919 – November 3, 1920
- Lieutenant: Creed H. Boucher; A. C. Kail
- Preceded by: John Martin Poyer
- Succeeded by: Waldo A. Evans

Personal details
- Born: May 3, 1869 Midland Park, New Jersey, US
- Died: November 3, 1920 (aged 51) Utulei, American Samoa
- Resting place: Arlington National Cemetery
- Spouse: Josephine Lee Smith Terhune
- Education: United States Naval Academy
- Occupation: Naval officer
- Awards: Order of the Bust of Bolivar

Military service
- Allegiance: United States
- Branch/service: United States Navy
- Years of service: 1889–1920
- Rank: Commander
- Commands: Seventh Naval District; Naval Air Station Key West; Dunwoody Naval Training School; USS Annapolis

Warren Jay Terhune (May 3, 1869 – November 3, 1920) was an American naval officer who was the governor of American Samoa from 1919 until his death in 1920.

He was born in Midland Park, New Jersey, and lived in New Jersey most of his life when not posted elsewhere. He was appointed to the United States Naval Academy in 1885 and graduated as an ensign in 1891. He was stationed on numerous ships and held command of various ships and stations throughout his career. His most notable command posts include the Seventh Naval District of South Florida and the Naval Air Station Key West within his jurisdiction. His largest engagement came when President William Howard Taft ordered the United States Marine Corps to Nicaragua in an attempt to put down a rebellion there, primarily out of the city of Managua. Terhune commanded USS Annapolis, which landed hundreds of troops to quell the violence and protect American civilians and property.

Terhune's governorship of American Samoa was wrought with problems and controversy. He revamped taxation on the island. He also took a number of steps to limit the power of the indigenous Samoans, believing they were not fit to govern themselves. He removed several local leaders from power and outlawed marriages between United States Navy sailors and Samoan women. His actions helped lead to the anti-imperialistic Mau movement, stemming from perceived racism and a belief that the marriage law promoted anti-Christian promiscuity. In addition, his two executive officers sympathized with the Mau, leading his first to file a complaint with the Secretary of the Navy. An inquiry was launched to the island, but before it could get there, Terhune, plagued with depression and health problems, killed himself by a gunshot through the heart on November 3, 1920, at noon. He was the first Governor of American Samoa to die in office.

== Life ==
Terhune was born in Midland Park, New Jersey on May 3, 1869. He lived in Hackensack, New Jersey, and graduated from Hackensack High School in 1885. Terhune was a vice-president of the Holland Society of New York.

== Naval career ==
Terhune entered the United States Naval Academy on May 19, 1885. He became an ensign on July 1, 1891. He served on USS Kearsarge from 1889 to 1891, USS Cushing from 1891 to 1894, the staff of the Judge Advocate General's Corps, U.S. Navy in 1894, USS Terror from 1896 to 1899, and USS Buffalo in 1901. He fought in the Spanish–American War and received the Order of the Bust of Bolivar from Venezuela in 1909.

He achieved the rank of commander in 1911. He commanded the Seventh Naval District until October 1917, when he became the Commandant of Dunwoody Naval Training School in Minneapolis, here he remained during World War I. While at the Seventh District, he also commanded the Naval Air Station Key West.

On at least one occasion, Terhune acted as counsel in a court martial, for Captain Franklin Steele Wilste of the United States Marine Corps, who was accused of failing to pay for uniforms, clothing, liquor, and other items.

=== Managua ===
During a rebellion against the United States armed forces in Managua, President William Howard Taft dispatched the Marines to the city. Terhune first landed a force of 365 men for the initial police action. Later, his force of 40 sailors and 10 marines attempted to break out of Managua and back to their ship, USS Annapolis, anchored in Corinto, Nicaragua. From there, they were to reestablish contact between the fleet and Managua, and protect the Americans and foreigners there. However, on the way, his train was taken by rebel forces; he was reluctant to attempt to take it back, until Major Smedley Butler convinced him it was the correct option. Convincing the rebels they had dynamite, the force took back the train and made it back to the ship.

== Governorship ==
Terhune was appointed Governor of American Samoa on March 18, 1919, and took office on June 10, 1919. Terhune faced many issues during his term, many involving economic issues like tax revenue. Other issues stemmed from race, like revising restrictions on intermarriages between whites and ethnic Samoans; controversy erupted when he banned marriages between Navy sailors and Samoan natives. The religious Christian Samoans not only claimed racism but that the law encouraged sailors to have sexual relations with young native girls, knowing they would never have to take responsibility for their actions. He took further action against the native people of the islands by stripping a number of tribal leaders of power. As his rationale, he wrote, "The natives are very charming people, but very childish... of the STONE AGE and are not capable of managing their affairs with wisdom." His actions helped lead to the anti-imperialist Mau movement. Terhune's executive officer, Lieutenant Commander Creed H. Boucher sided with the Mau, so Terhune had him replaced. Boucher was later found guilty of fomenting unrest among the Samoans. However, the replacement, Commander A. C. Kail, likewise proved not to work well with Terhune, and also supported the Mau cause. Terhune's first run-in with the Mau occurred when a group of Samoans returned to the island from the United States, seeking to enter the land development business. He established the sixth American Samoan government department on November 15, 1919, with the establishment of the American Samoa Department of Public Works.

Upon hearing of the multiple difficulties Terhune was having, Secretary of the Navy Lieutenant Commander Josephus Daniels ordered an inquiry after accusations from Boucher, sending Captain Waldo Evans to lead the investigation. A few days before the probe reached the island, Terhune had a morning meeting with the island chiefs who remained loyal, and appeared "in good spirits". However, later reports suggested that Terhune had been suffering from severe depression and heart problems. Terhune then shot himself in the heart with a .45 pistol in a bathroom of the Government House in Utulei, American Samoa at noon November 3, 1920. His body was found by the cook, Felisiano Debid Ah-Chica. Terhune's wife and a group of doctors rushed to his aid, but found him already dead. Upon arrival, Waldo Evans was appointed governor on November 11, 1920, taking over from Kail, who had temporarily taken the post; and the court later exonerated Terhune. In his two days as acting governor, Kail attempted to undo a number of Terhune's policies, including firing the head surgeon who had refused to declare Terhune insane. Terhune's suicide makes him the only American Samoan governor to die in office, and his ghost is rumored to wander the grounds of the Government House.

Following Governor Terhune's suicide, several of his controversial laws were rescinded, including the reinstatement of Mauga Moi Moi and Sātele Itulā to their positions as district governors in the Western and Eastern Districts.

Terhune and his wife Josephine Lee (1868–1955) are buried at Arlington National Cemetery.
