= Samuel Sailele Ripley =

- Born: November 22, 1883; Leone, American Samoa
- Died: July 8, 1961 (aged 77)
- Occupations: Political leader, activist
- Known for: Leader of the Mau movement in American Samoa, Mayor of Richmond, California
- Title: Mayor of Richmond, California
- Spouse: Madge A. Ripley
- Relatives: E.V. Ripley (father)

Samuel Sailele Ripley (November 22, 1883 – July 8, 1961) was a leader of the Mau movement in American Samoa, which sought resistance to U.S. colonial rule in the early 20th century. For his involvement, he was deported, barred, and exiled from his homeland by the U.S. government. On July 1, 1940, he became the mayor of Richmond, California.

Ripley returned home to Leone in July 1920, at a pivotal moment when tensions surrounding the Mau movement were escalating. By that time, the movement, which had arisen in February 1920 to oppose the U.S. Naval Administration, was gaining momentum, and Ripley aligned himself with its cause. The movement was suppressed by the U.S. government, which led to his exile.

Ripley was the first Samoan to be barred from entering the land of his birth. Both C.S. Hannum and Arthur A. Greene worked with the Ripleys to obtain approval for a land development project in Leone.

== Early life ==
Samuel Ripley, the eldest son of E.V. Ripley of New York and a mother from the Le’oso family of Leone, was born in Leone, American Samoa. In 1904, he moved to California and enlisted in the U.S. Army, later serving in Europe during World War I. After his military service, he spent some time working in New York before returning to California, where he married Madge.

== Mau movement ==
After World War I, a member of the Ripley family from Leone — or possibly a relative connected to them overseas — proposed the idea of forming a family corporation focused on planting and trading. The Ripley family traced its lineage to E.V.P. Ripley of New York, who had settled in Leone in the mid-19th century after marrying a Samoan woman. Samuel S. Ripley, a descendant, had moved to California in 1904. During World War I, he served as a U.S. Army sergeant stationed in France and later worked as an electrician at the Mare Island Naval Shipyard. His wife, Madge A. Ripley, a University of California graduate from California, was employed as a secretary to attorney C.S. Hannum in Richmond, California. While the plan to develop family lands might have been viable in the United States or Hawai‘i, it encountered significant obstacles in American Samoa. The Native Lands Ordinance of 1900 prohibited the alienation of Samoan lands, and the U.S. Navy's copra monopoly rendered such ventures unfeasible, even on a small scale.

In July 1920, Samuel Ripley returned to American Samoa from California, marking his first visit since leaving in 1904. His goal was to establish a new copra plantation using family lands in Leone, but he quickly ran into government opposition, as such business ventures were prohibited. In response, Ripley aligned himself with the Mau movement and enlisted C.S. Hannum, his wife's employer in California, as the movement's legal counsel. Hannum initiated extensive correspondence between Samoa and Washington, D.C., advising Ripley to challenge the legitimacy of U.S. Navy rule in Samoa, arguing it was unofficial and thereby invalidated its laws and taxes. The Ripleys sought a full congressional investigation to halt the exploitation of Samoans by the U.S. From July to November 1920, Ripley was involved with the Mau movement until he and his wife were deported by Governor Waldo A. Evans. Nearly a year later, on August 15, 1921, Ripley attempted to re-enter American Samoa but was intercepted at the Pago Pago dock and deported a second time due to his involvement in the Mau movement.

Ripley expressed his frustrations in an article published on October 11, 1921, in the Record-Herald and in a piece for The Nation titled "Our American Autocracy in Samoa." His wife, Madge, contributed by writing a detailed letter to Mrs. Warren G. Harding, sharing her perspective on the situation. The Ripleys also addressed various men's and women's clubs and organizations in California, encouraging their members to protest the U.S. Naval Administration's actions in Samoa. Their efforts led to a wave of letters sent to the President and the U.S. Secretary of the Navy, denouncing the administration's methods as un-American.
