= Fono (disambiguation) =

Fono may refer to:

== Legislature ==
- American Samoa Fono, the legislature of American Samoa
- Legislative Assembly of Samoa, sometimes referred to as the Samoan Fono
  - The Fono of Faipule, a former legislature in Samoa
- General Fono, the parliament of Tokelau

== Music ==
- Fono (band), British–American rock band
- Luke Fono (born 1990), English record producer, electronic dance musician

== Other places ==
- Fono, Togo, a village in Kara Region
