= Waldo A. Evans =

American Navy captain and military governor

Waldo A. Evans (1869 – April 15, 1936) was a captain of the United States Navy and military Governor of both the United States Virgin Islands and American Samoa. He was the last military governor of the U. S. Virgin Islands.

Waldo Evans was sent to American Samoa by U.S. Navy Secretary Josephus Daniels in 1920 to lead a court of inquiry investigating turmoil and strong opposition to Governor Warren Terhune. Three weeks after Terhune's suicide in Utulei, Evans submitted a report in November 1920 that exonerated the Governor. Before he could return to the U.S., Evans was ordered to remain in American Samoa and assume the governorship. He is particularly remembered for establishing a public school system, requiring villages to provide buildings while the government supplied teachers. At the time, only three schools existed in the territory, but Evans established sixteen new schools within two years. In 1922, Evans improved the road system and established the Leone Rapid Transit system. He also ordered the first compilation of American Samoa laws. The territory experienced an economic boost as people resumed cutting copra. In January 1927, based on his successful performance in American Samoa, Curtis D. Wilbur called him out of retirement to serve as Governor of the U.S. Virgin Islands.

== Governorship ==
Governor Evans played a significant role in revitalizing the economy of American Sāmoa, particularly through the revival of the copra industry. Although copra production had halted in March 1920, it resumed in November, and the total output by the end of the year—combined with production from the first three months of 1920 — made it the second most economically successful year in the territory's history.

== Life and naval career ==
Evans was born in Indianapolis, Indiana. During World War I, he commanded three cruisers starting in 1917, USS Olympia, USS New Orleans, and USS St. Louis. In 1919, he was given command of the battleship USS Wyoming.

From 1920 to 1922, Evans was made the military governor of American Samoa during a period of native unrest and immediately after the suicide of Governor Warren Jay Terhune. His investigation focused on two sailors, one of whom was later court martialed, and one civilian, who was deported back to the United States.

In 1922, he was made commander of the Great Lakes Naval Training Station, near Chicago. In 1925, he retired from the Navy.

After the unexpected death of Governor Trench, Evans was asked out of retirement to govern the United States Virgin Islands. As Governor, Evans signed a bill which granted all citizens of the islands United States citizenship, effective February 28, 1927. In September 1928, the islands were hit by a hurricane, resulting in six deaths and $400,000 worth of property damage (approximately $4.3 million in inflation-adjusted 2005 dollars). He also faced opposition from the sugar plantations in the territories by his insistence that they modernize, due to the potential cut on a sugar tax. In 1931, President Herbert Hoover placed the island under civilian rule, also ending Evans' term as Governor on March 18, 1931.

In 1935, Evans' wife died in an automobile accident in California. Following her death, he fell into ill health and had a stroke. He died in Des Moines, Iowa, in 1936.

Political offices
Preceded by Warren Jay Terhune	Governor of American Samoa; 1920–1922	Succeeded by Edwin Taylor Pollock
Preceded by Martin Edwin Trench	Governor of the U.S. Virgin Islands; 1927–1931	Succeeded by Paul Martin Pearson
