= Susana Leiato Lutali =

American Samoan educator and politician

First Lady of American Samoa
- In office January 3, 1993 – January 3, 1997
- Governor: A. P. Lutali
- Preceded by: Nora Stewart Coleman
- Succeeded by: Fagaoalii Satele Sunia
- In office January 3, 1985 – January 2, 1989
- Governor: A. P. Lutali
- Preceded by: Nora Stewart Coleman
- Succeeded by: Nora Stewart Coleman

Personal details
- Born: Susana Leiato; May 23, 1932; Fagaʻitua, American Samoa
- Died: June 15, 2012 (aged 80) 'Ili'ili, American Samoa
- Political party: Democratic
- Spouse: A. P. Lutali (m. 1954; died 2002)
- Children: Nine

Susana Leiato Lutali, also spelled Susana Le'iato Lutali, (May 23, 1932 – June 15, 2012) was an American Samoan educator and politician. She served as the First Lady of American Samoa from 1985 to 1989 and 1993 until 1997 during the tenure of her husband, former Governor A. P. Lutali. She held the matai title of Maeata'anoa from her home village of Fagaʻitua.

Lutlai was known for her beautification and landscaping initiatives along public roads across American Samoa during her two tenures as first lady. Many of the roadside, ornamental trees, bushes and shrubs which still line major streets in American Samoa were planted by Lutali and her public beautification programs.

== Biography ==
Lutali was born on May 23, 1932, in Fagaʻitua, American Samoa, to Taetuli So’oma’ali’i Tupua Le'iato and Anasitasia Lauatua'a Malepeai. She became a teacher at Fagaʻitua Elemenatary School. She married her husband, A. P. Lutali, a public school administrator, on April 2, 1954.

Susana Leiato Lutali served as the First Lady of American Samoa during her husband's gubernatorial terms from 1985 to 1989 and again 1993 until 1997. As first lady, Lutali spearheaded numerous beautification programs along public roadsides across American Samoa. Lutali created committees of women who planted new trees and shrubs. Many of the same ornamental trees and bushes originally planted by First Lady Lutali and her initiatives are still found along roads and streets throughout the territory. Lutali also became known for her puletasis, a traditional outfit worn by Samoan women, which she almost always wore as first lady.

In the 2004 general election, Lutali was a candidate for the American Samoa House of Representatives in the District #5's (Sua No. 1), which includes the villages of Amaua, Auto, Alega, Avaio, Aumi, Fagaʻitua, and Lauli'i. However, she was not elected.

Lutali was diagnosed with inoperable uterine cancer in 2011. She died from the illness at her home in 'Ili'ili, Tuālāuta County, American Samoa, on June 15, 2012, at the age of 80. (Samoa News originally reported that she died at LBJ Tropical Medical Center in Fagaʻalu.) She was survived by eight of her nine children, as well as her grandchildren.

Her funeral was held at St. Paul's Catholic Church in 'Ili'ili. Susana Leiato Lutali was buried next to her husband, the late Governor A.P. Lutali, at her family compound in 'Ili'ili on June 29, 2012.
