= Vaifanua County =

County of Eastern District, American Samoa

Coordinates: 14°15′56″S 170°35′2″W

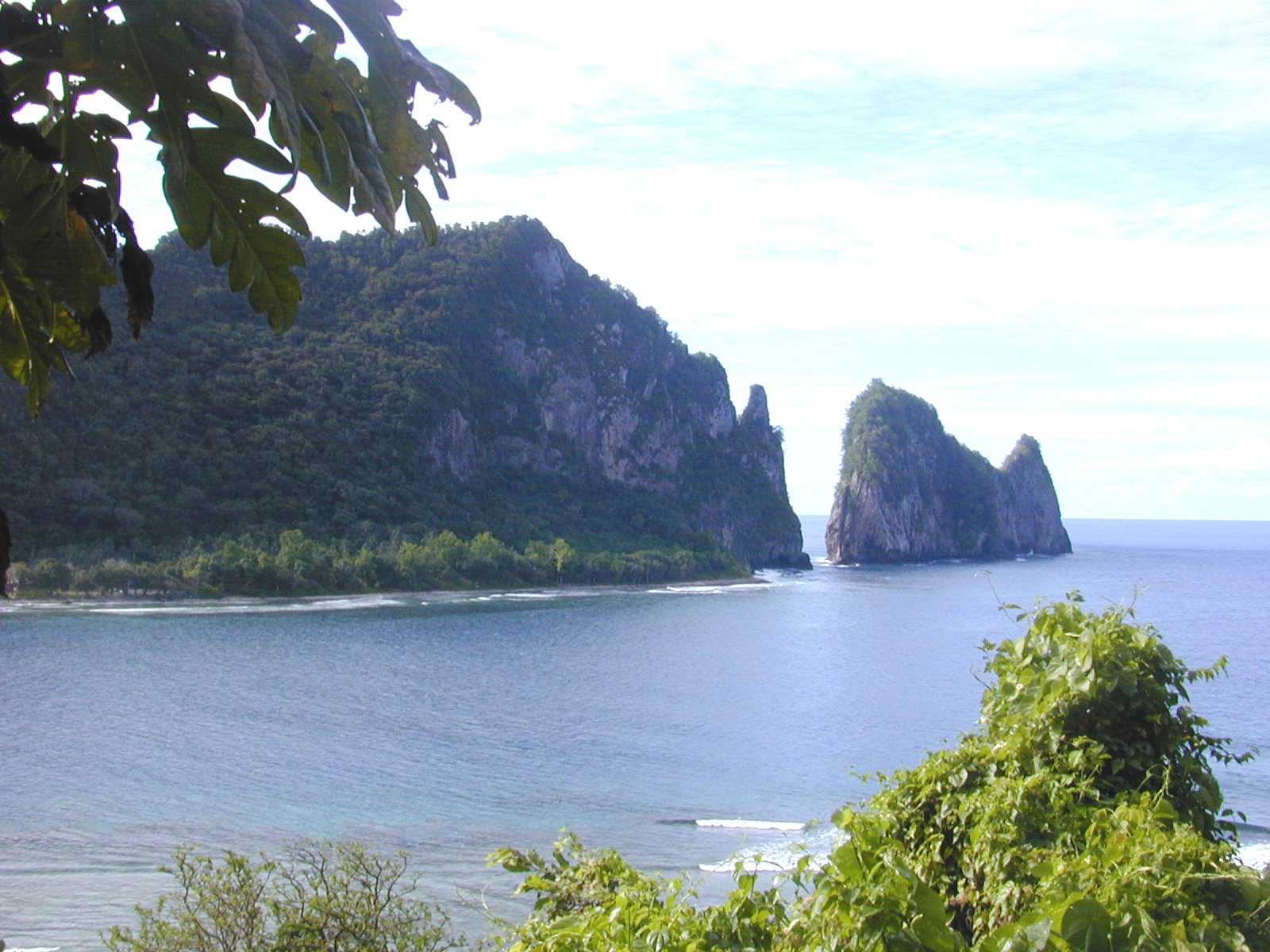

Vaifanua County is a county in the Eastern District in American Samoa.

Vaifanua and Sua counties are both ruled by the Le’iato family, one branch of which lives in Fagaitua, the principal place of Sua County. Another lives in Sa'ilele near Aoa, which is the principal place of Vaifanua County. These two Le’iato family branches, along with two orators from each, conduct the affairs of government for the two counties.

== Demographics ==
Historical population
| Year | Pop. | ±% |
|---|---|---|
| 1912 | 405 | — |
| 1920 | 504 | +24.4% |
| 1930 | 630 | +25.0% |
| 1940 | 801 | +27.1% |
| 1950 | 1,192 | +48.8% |
| 1960 | 1,305 | +9.5% |
| 1970 | N/A | — |
| 1980 | 1,459 | — |
| 1990 | 2,121 | +45.4% |
| 2000 | 2,249 | +6.0% |
| 2010 | 2,545 | +13.2% |
| 2020 | 1,487 | −41.6% |
U.S. Decennial Census

Vaifanua County was first recorded beginning with the 1912 special census. Regular decennial censuses were taken beginning in 1920. For 1970, Vaifanua County was split in two: East Vaifanua County (which encompassed the 4 villages of Alao, Aoa, Onenoa and Tula) and West Vaifanua County (which encompassed the single village of Vatia).

For that 1970 census, East Vaifanua County reported 1,163 residents and West Vaifanua County reported 391 residents. They were merged back effective with the 1980 census.

== Villages ==
- Alao
- Aoa
- Onenoa
- Tula
- Vatia
