= Amouli, American Samoa =

Āmouli
- Village
- Location within American Samoa
- Coordinates: 14°16′41″S 170°34′57″W
- Country: United States
- Territory: American Samoa
- County: Sa'Ole

Area
  - Total: 0.63 sq mi (1.64 km^{2})

Population (2020)
  - Total: 261
  - Density: 412/sq mi (159/km^{2})

Āmouli is a village on the southeast coast of Tutuila Island, American Samoa at the narrowest point of the island. It is located to the west of 'Au'asi, immediately to the south of ʻAoa on the north coast. It was home to 920 residents at the 2010 U.S. census, all of which were Pacific Islanders by race. It is located in Sa'Ole County.

A larger shipwreck is located right beside the road in Āmouli. Locals say the vessel ran aground with a full load of fish, and when it overturned, it spilled its cargo within reach of villagers to gather it.

Dr. Charles Fletcher of the University of Hawaiʻi at Mānoa has conducted a sea level study of Āmouli village. He was the keynote speaker at American Samoa's first climate change summit in 2011, where he revealed that land in the village near the sea could be covered by water within ten years.

== History ==
Before 1920, the Public Health Department of American Samoa operated branch dispensaries in Leone and Taʻū Island. In 1921, Governor Waldo A. Evans established an additional dispensary in Amouli to expand medical services to the Eastern District, thereby enhancing healthcare accessibility.

== Geography ==
Amouli is located near the east coast of Tutuila Island, directly across from Aunu’u Island.

== Demographics ==
Year	Population
2020	261
2010	920
2000	520
1990	463
1980	363
1970	357
1960	293
1950	155
1940	180
1930	115
