= Pagai, American Samoa =

Pagai Pagai Pagai State
- Village
- Pagai
- Nickname: Pagai State
- Location within American Samoa
- Coordinates: 14°16′30″S 170°36′19″W
- Country: United States
- Territory: American Samoa
- County: Sa'Ole and Suʻa

Area
  - Total: 0.14 sq mi (0.36 km^{2})

Population (2020)
  - Total: 81
  - Density: 580/sq mi (230/km^{2})
- ZIP Code: 96799

Pagai is a village on the southeast coast of Tutuila Island, American Samoa. It is located on the edge of Faga'itua Bay, and in between the villages of Faga'itua and Alofau. Pagai is six miles east of Pago Pago.

Pagai straddles the county border between Sa'Ole County and Sua County.

== Demographics ==
Year	Population
2020	81
2010	118
2000	122
1990	107
1980	-
