= Alofau, American Samoa =

Alofau Ālōfau
- Village
- Location within American Samoa
- Coordinates: 14°16′45″S 170°36′8″W
- Country: United States
- Territory: American Samoa
- County: Sa'ole

Area
  - Total: 0.50 sq mi (1.29 km^{2})

Population (2020)
  - Total: 296
  - Density: 594/sq mi (229/km^{2})
- Time zone: UTC−11 (Samoa Time Zone)
- ZIP code: 96799
- Area code: +1 684

Alofau (Samoan: Ālōfau) is a village on the southeast coast of Tutuila Island, American Samoa. It is located at the eastern end of Faga'itua Bay, six miles east of Pago Pago, between Pagai and Amouli. It is home to Alofau Village Marine Protected Area. It is an agrarian and traditional village. It is lauded as a kava place in the Manu'a Songs. Alofau is located in Sa'ole County.

Alofau Volcano is a major named volcano on Tutuila Island, although it is sometimes regarded as part of Pago Volcano.

Great surfing conditions can be found in Faga'itua Bay near Alofau.

An Adventist congregation had been established in the village by 1956.

== History ==
In 1914, Max Haleck of Dessau, Germany, arrived in Alofau. After leaving Germany to explore the Pacific, he joined the South Seas Trading Company and worked as a trader, exchanging fishhooks for copra and selling copra to the government for export. His son Otto (b. 1920) later took over and expanded the family enterprises into groceries, hardware, real estate, and development—especially in Tafuna; another son, Max Haleck Jr., purchased the Sadie Thompson Inn.

== Geology ==
Alofau Volcano consists of thin-bedded aa and pāhoehoe flows, breccias, dikes, and tuffs exposed in a shield-shaped dome. The volcanic dome covers around 2,4 km^{2}. on the east side of Faga'itua Bay. The volcano is built over a rift zone trending northeast–southwest. The lava flows are thinly bedded primitive olivine basalts, dipping 10-20 degrees away from Alofau village. A dike complex is exposed on the road southeast of Fagaitua village, while another 130 dikes are exposed in a promontory on the north side of Alofau. Large numbers of dikes are also seen south of Alofau village.

== Demographics ==
Year	Population
2020	296
2010	646
2000	495
1990	458
1980	418
1970	378
1960	316
1950	304
1940	134
1930	103

== Notable people ==
- Faauuga Suesue Lutu Achica, president of the National Women’s Council of American Samoa and the Chairperson of the American Samoa Red Cross.

== See also ==
- Alofau Village Marine Protected Area
