= Le'iato =

Le'iato may refer to:

- Earvin Magic Le'Iato, American Samoan basketball player
- Susana Leiato Lutali (1932-2012), American Samoan educator and politician
- Tuli Leʻiato (1917-1983), American Fa'amatai leader and politician
- Tupua Eteuati Le'iato, former Speaker of the American Samoa House of Representatives
