= Nora Stewart Coleman =

First Lady of American Samoa (1920–2005)

First Lady of American Samoa
- In office January 2, 1989 – January 3, 1993
- Governor: Peter Tali Coleman
- Preceded by: Susana Leiato Lutali
- Succeeded by: Susana Leiato Lutali
- In office January 3, 1978 – January 3, 1985
- Governor: Peter Tali Coleman
- Preceded by: Lillian Lee
- Succeeded by: Susana Leiato Lutali
- In office October 15, 1956 – May 24, 1961
- Preceded by: Emma Louise Lowe
- Succeeded by: Lillian Lee

Personal details
- Born: Nora Kawailiula Stewart; December 11, 1920 Honolulu, Territory of Hawaii, U.S.
- Died: May 11, 2005 (aged 84) Honolulu, Hawaii, U.S.
- Party: Republican
- Spouse: Peter Tali Coleman (m. 1941; died 1997)
- Children: Thirteen, including Amata Coleman Radewagen

Nora Kawailiula Stewart Coleman (December 11, 1920 – May 11, 2005) was an American public figure who served as the First Lady of American Samoa for four tenures spanning five decades (1956–1961, 1978–1985 and 1989–1993). Coleman first became first lady of American Samoa from 1956 to 1961 when her husband, Peter Tali Coleman, was appointed the civilian governor of the U.S. territory. She returned to the role of first lady in 1978 after Peter Tali Coleman became the first popularly elected Governor of American Samoa. Coleman later served as first lady once again from 1989 to 1993 during her husband's final term as governor.

Coleman, who was born in Hawaii, became the first woman from the Pacific Islands to serve as first lady of American Samoa in 1956. Like her husband, who was one of the longest-serving governors of any jurisdiction in American history, Nora Stewart Coleman was one of the longest-serving first ladies of any territory in U.S. history.

Her daughter, Amata Coleman Radewagen, was elected Delegate to represent American Samoa in the United States House of Representatives in 2014.

== Biography ==
Coleman was born Nora Kawailiula Stewart in Honolulu, Hawaii, as one of seven siblings - six sisters and one brother. She was of Chinese, German, Native Hawaiian, and Scottish descent. Her siblings including the writer Julia Stewart Williams.

Stewart attended Sacred Hearts Academy, an all-girls Roman Catholic school in Kaimuki, and graduated with honors from Kamehameha High School for Girls in 1938. She attended the University of Hawaiʻi at Mānoa for one year, but was forced to withdraw before completing her degree in order to support her family following the death of her father.

In 1940, she met her future husband, Peter Tali Coleman, while working at a charity fashion show. She was modeling a dress loaned from Bishop Museum that had once been owned by the Hawaiian Royal Family, while he appeared at the event as a Kāhili bearer. The couple married in 1941 and had thirteen children during their marriage, including U.S. Delegate Amata Coleman Radewagen (R-American Samoa).

Nora Stewart Coleman first visited in American Samoa on board the USS President Jackson (APA-18) with her husband in June 1952. American Samoa's jurisdiction was being transferred from the United States Navy to the Department of the Interior at the time. The Colemans had traveled to Tutuila on board the USS President Jackson to escort members of the Fita Fita Guard, who were being transferred to a U.S. naval base in Honolulu. Five years later, Peter Tali Coleman was appointed civilian governor of American Samoa by the Interior Department in 1956, becoming the first Samoan governor of the territory. Nora Stewart Coleman, who was born and raised in Hawaii, became the first Pacific Islander to serve as First Lady of American Samoa in history. They remained in American Samoa from 1956 to 1961. Following the end of his governorship, Coleman followed her husband across the Pacific to his various postings. These included tenures as District Administrator for the Marshall Islands and District Administrator of the Northern Mariana Islands (both from 1965 to 1969), Deputy High Commissioner of the Trust Territory of the Pacific Islands from 1969 to 1975, and acting High Commissioner of the Trust Territory of the Pacific Islands from 1976 to 1977.

In 1977, Peter and Nora Stewart Coleman returned to American Samoa to launch his candidacy in the territory's first ever gubernatorial election. Peter Tali Coleman became the first popularly elected Governor of American Samoa, resulting in Nora Stewart Coleman becoming first lady again in 1978. She served as first lady from 1978 to 1985 and again from 1989 until 1993 during her husband's tenure in office. Coleman focused on education and children's issues during her tenure as first lady. She often addressed women's groups and church congregations.

Peter Tali Coleman died in 1997. Coleman largely retired from public life following her husband's death. She took to art and music at her family home in Niu Valley, Honolulu.

In 2003, Coleman's Kamehameha high school class ring, which she had lost while swimming in Waikiki in 1938, was returned to her by a woman from Virginia. The woman's aunt had originally found the ring at the beach in 1996. The return of Coleman's ring became news in Hawaii, with articles appearing in the Honolulu Star-Bulletin and the Honolulu Advertiser.

Coleman suffered a cerebral hemorrhage at her home in the Niu Valley neighborhood of Honolulu on May 1, 2005. She died at The Queen's Medical Center in Honolulu on May 11, 2005, at the age of 85. Coleman was survived by twelve of her thirteen children.

Her funeral was held at Saint Patrick Catholic Church in Honolulu on May 20, 2005, with burial next to her husband, the late Governor Peter Tali Coleman, in Diamond Head Memorial Park.
