= List of museums in American Samoa =

Museums in American Samoa include:

- Jean P Haydon Museum
- Tauese P.F. Sunia Ocean Center
