= Tula, American Samoa =

Tula
- Village
- Location in American Samoa
- Coordinates: 14°15′10″S 170°33′56″W
- Country: United States
- Territory: American Samoa
- County: Vaifanua

Area
  - Land: 0.51 sq mi (1.3 km^{2})

Population (2020)
  - Total: 308
  - Density: 794.5/sq mi (306.8/km^{2})

Tula is a village in the Eastern District of Tutuila Island in American Samoa. Tula is located in Vaifanua County and had a population of 405 as of the 2010 U.S. census.

Tula is located on Cape Matātula. It is the site of the former upland ridge settlement of Lefutu (AS-21-002). Cape Matatula, which is the northeastern point of Tutuila Island, consists of high rocks that project some distance seaward, forming a prominent headland. The cape's rugged terrain and protruding rocks make it a notable geographical feature.

== Etymology ==
The name of the village, Tula, is derived from the Samoan language and translates into English as “Bald”, “Bare” or "Barren".

Lefutu, which is a hamlet or inland village in Tula, translates to “Barringtonia tree”.

== History ==
Tula was one of the first settlements on Tutuila, having been settled by 600 BCE. Numerous ancient artifacts have been discovered at the prehistoric quarry near the town. The Lau'agae Ridge Quarry is the largest of its kind on Tutuila Island.

The prehistoric village of Tulauta (AS-21-1) is located approximately 500 meters inland from the coastal village of Tula. It is situated at the rear of the Tula Valley. Large quantities of basalt debris have been found at Tulauta.

During World War II, the U.S. Marine Corps constructed a radar station at Cape Matātula in Tula. This installation included 14 buildings, such as living quarters, mess halls, and storage facilities, to support radar operations.

In 1985, Gould, Honor, and Reinhardt asserted that the abundance of basalt flakes at the site indicates that Tulauta was among the largest basalt quarries and lithic or adze manufacturing centers in Polynesia. Features identified at the site include 10 to 13 house foundations, two pigsty enclosures, several graves, rock alignments, pits, fireplaces, and walls. One house foundation, elevated higher than the others, is hypothesized to have served as the base for a chief’s house. Additionally, potential evidence of a fale aitu (spirit house) or related structure exists, and a malae (ceremonial ground) may be present in a featureless area dividing the northern and southern clusters of structures. Archaeologists have consistently noted a significant number of basalt artifacts at Tulauta, with over 200 adzes and more than 100 flake tools recovered from the site. Radiocarbon dating results have varied: Frost reported dates of approximately 2560 ± 140 BCE and 630 ± 70 years BCE. Gould obtained dates of 190 ± 80 years BCE and 420 ± 80 years BCE.

== Geography ==
Tula is the easternmost village on Tutuila Island, and is situated on the rugged northeast cape of Matātula. It is home to wide, white sand beaches and a prehistoric quarry. The Samoa Observatory, established in 1974 by National Oceanic and Atmospheric Administration (NOAA), sits on Cape Matātula just outside the village of Tula. NASA's Advanced Global Atmospheric Gases Experiment (AGAGE) measures more than 40 trace gases involved in stratospheric ozone depletion, climate change, and air quality at the observatory.

Cape Matā'ula and the nearby village of Onenoa feature small plantations, high cliffs, and forested slopes.

Since 1961, American Samoa has witnessed significant changes in its wetlands across different regions. Wetlands in Tula have experienced an 8-acre decrease since 1961, amounting to a 58% loss.

=== Geology ===
Tula is closely associated with the geological features of the Olomoana Volcano. The volcanic rocks in this region consist predominantly of olivine basalts, which are geographically limited in extent. Geological studies suggest that these formations resulted from volcanic activity on the northeast rift of the nearby Ālōfau Volcano during the final stages of Pliocene volcanic activity on the island. Evidence of this contemporaneous activity includes the overlapping of Ālōfau volcanic flows on the western slope of the Olomoana volcanic cone. The Olomoana volcanic system spans approximately 2.4 square kilometers and dominates the landscape surrounding the peak near Tula. Notable geological features include several intrusive volcanic plugs, crater fills, and cinder cones, prominently exposed along the eastern coastline. Cape Matatula, within the vicinity of Tula, is recognized as the largest intrusive volcanic plug in the area. This region is characterized by interbedded flows and palagonitized vitric tuffs. Additionally, the Lefulufulu'a trachyte plug intrudes through these layers, adding to the complex geological history of the area. A large, partially exhumed cinder cone is visible in the stream bed that drains towards Tula, offering further insight into the region's volcanic heritage.

== Demographics ==
Year	Population
2020	308
2010	405
2000	413
1990	423
1980	347
1970	329
1960	340
1950	261
1940	104
1930	128

== Notable people ==
- Composer and radio host Iosefa Salanoa Solatoa (1925-1985) was born and raised in Tula. He composed one of the most popular songs in the Samoan Islands, “Le Eleele ua le Malie i Vai”, and later became President of the Samoan Civic Association of Hawai’i.
- Taupule James Valavala - Kodiak Island commercial fishing operator.
- Elisara Tiamo Togia’i, member of the American Samoa House of Representatives.
