= Saʻole County =

County of Eastern District, American Samoa

Coordinates: 14°17′2.7″S 170°33′37.5″W

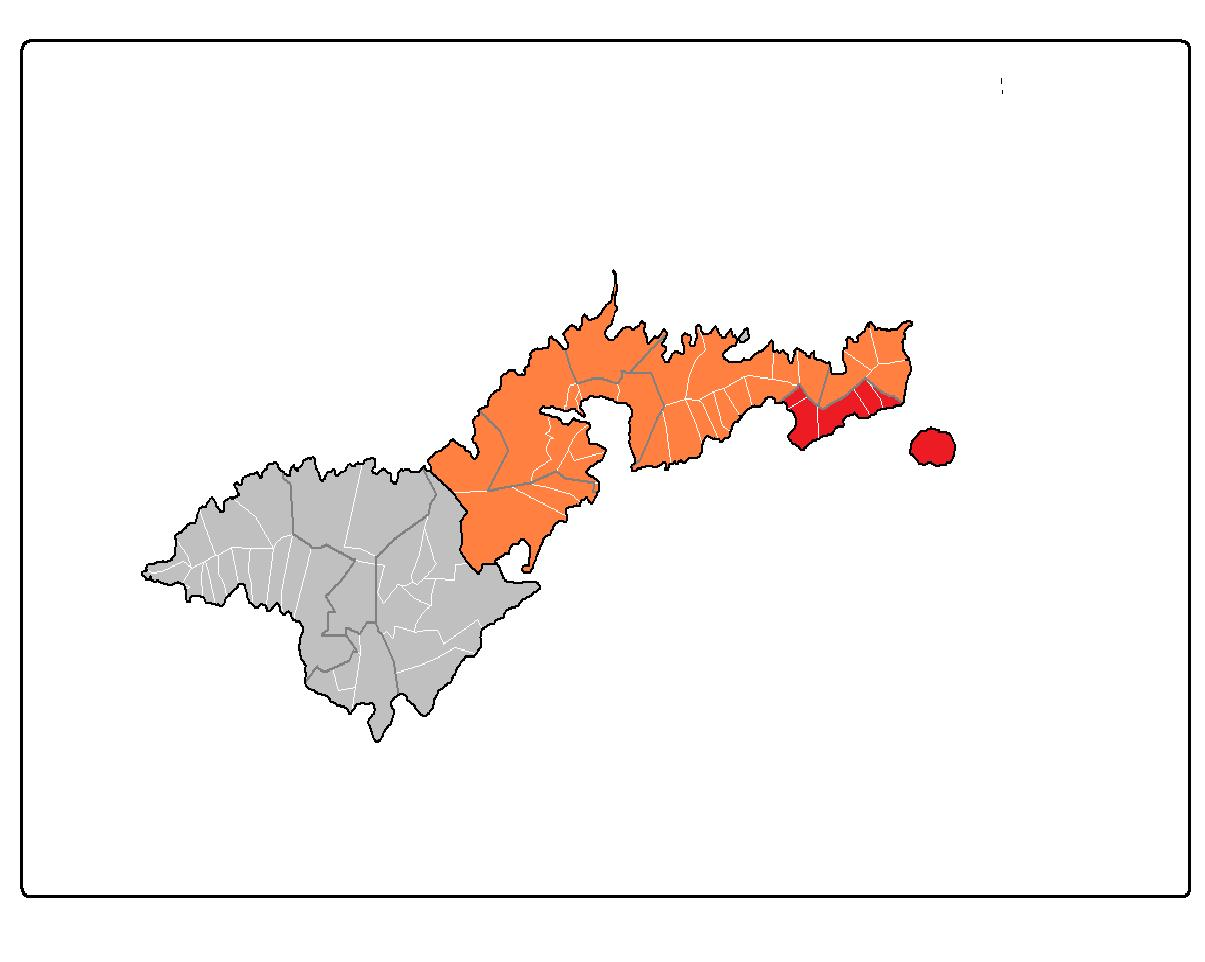
Map of Tutuila where Saʻole County is highlighted in red, while the Eastern District is marked in orange.

Saʻole County is a county in the Eastern District in American Samoa. The county consists of Aunu'u Island together with its foothold upon Tutuila Island, Ālōfau and Āmouli.

== History ==
Saʻole County had traditionally been referred to in Samoan as "O lea Fagola" (The Long Bay). The historical high chief of the county is referred to as Faumuina. In 2000, there was a dispute between High Chief Faumuina and the Tautolo of Aunu`u regarding land ownership in Saʻole County. Tautolo leased water and waste disposal facilities on his land on Aunu`u Island to the American Samoa Power Authority. Faumuina objected to this, claiming he had pule (control) over the land. The High Court of American Samoa adjudged that Faumina did not have pule over Tautolo's land. Whilst the High Chief was owed respect for his title, it was held that outside of the Faumuina family's communal lands he did not have the ability to assert pule over another family's land. High Chief Faumuina still represents Saʻole County in representations to the American Samoan local government as well as to the government of the United States, including addressing petitions to the United States Congress and President of the United States.

== Demographics ==
Historical population
Year	Pop.	±%
1912	332	—
1920	366	+10.2%
1930	471	+28.7%
1940	678	+43.9%
1950	844	+24.5%
1960	1,105	+30.9%
1970	1,295	+17.2%
1980	1,359	+4.9%
1990	1,643	+20.9%
2000	1,768	+7.6%
2010	2,187	+23.7%
2020	1,158	−47.1%
U.S. Decennial Census

Saʻole County was first recorded beginning with the 1912 special census. Regular decennial censuses were taken beginning in 1920.

== Villages ==
Saʻole County's main settlements include Āmouli, Utumea and Ālōfau (including 'Au'asi and a portion of Pagai). It also administers Aunu'u Island. Until 2020, the village of Sagai was considered as a part of Sa'ole County when it was moved to Sua County for census purposes.
