= Alega, American Samoa =

Alega
- Village
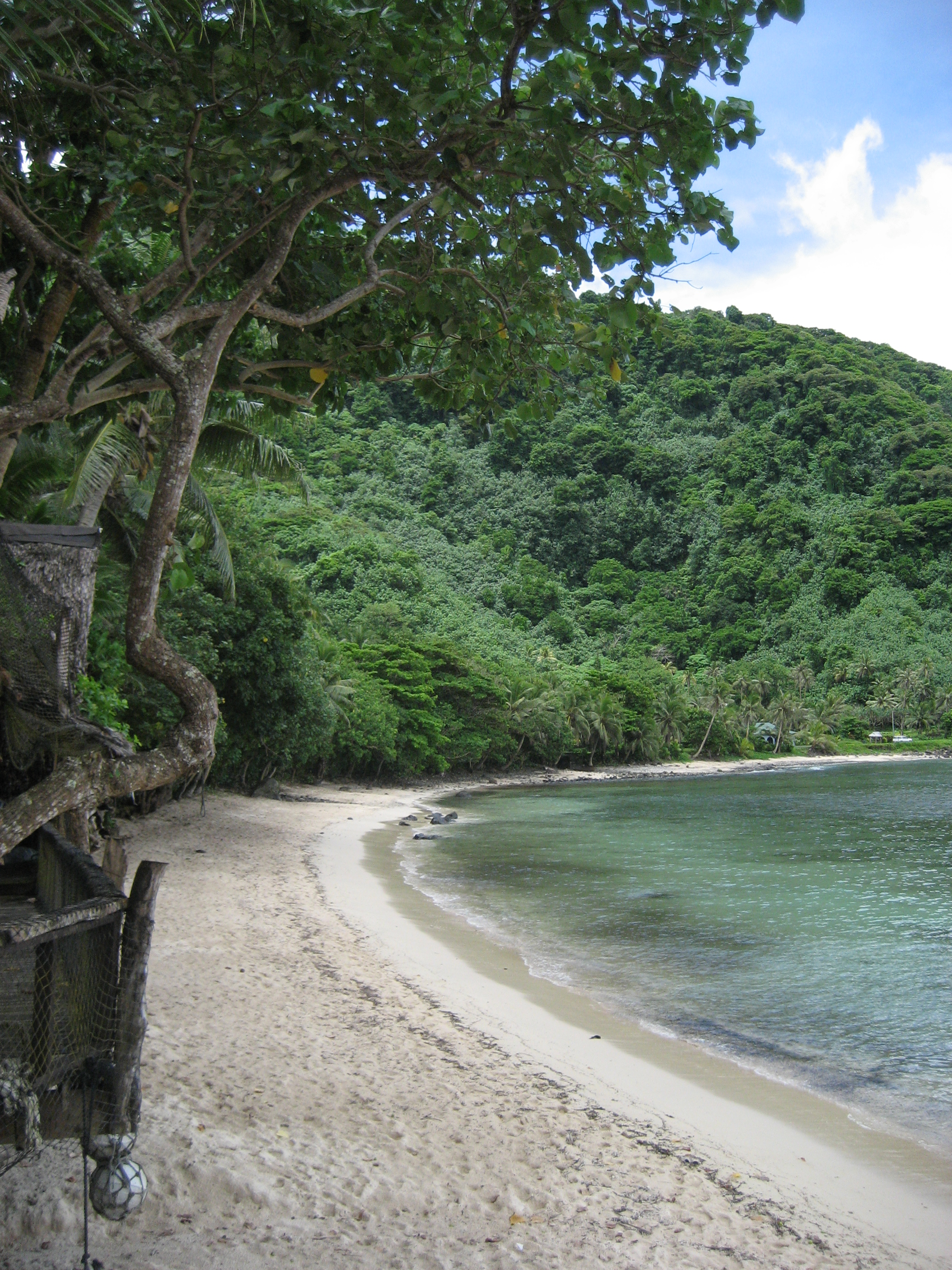
- Alega Beach

- Location within American Samoa
- Coordinates: 14°17′7″S 170°38′15″W
- Country: United States
- Territory: American Samoa
- County: Sua

Area
  - Total: 0.31 sq mi (0.79 km^{2})
- Elevation: 26 ft (8 m)

Population (2020)
  - Total: 29
  - Density: 95/sq mi (37/km^{2})

Alega (Samoan: Ālega) is a village on the southeast coast of Tutuila Island, American Samoa. One of the island's least populous villages, it is located to the east of Pago Pago Harbor and to the west of Faga'itua Bay. Alega, with a population of 29 according to the 2020 U.S. census, is one of the smallest villages in American Samoa, surpassing only Maloata and Sili in population.

Alega lies between Lauli'i and Avaio villages, and is home to Alega Village Marine Protected Area. Bus services are frequent between Alega and Fagatogo. The village offers ecotour activities such as food tastings, umu displays, cultural demonstrations, visits to the caves, hikes to Alega Waterfall and recreational water activities such as snorkeling, kayaking, and swimming. Tours are also offered to sites in the National Park area and transportation to 'Au'asi where ferries are offered to Aunu'u Island.

Another scenic beach, Two Dollar Beach, is located next to Alega Beach.

On the coast near Avaio lies the islet Faalogologotala Rock (Lions Head), where there is a small beach.

== History ==
During World War II, the U.S. Marines established a military camp in Alega, comprising approximately 25 buildings.

== Geography ==
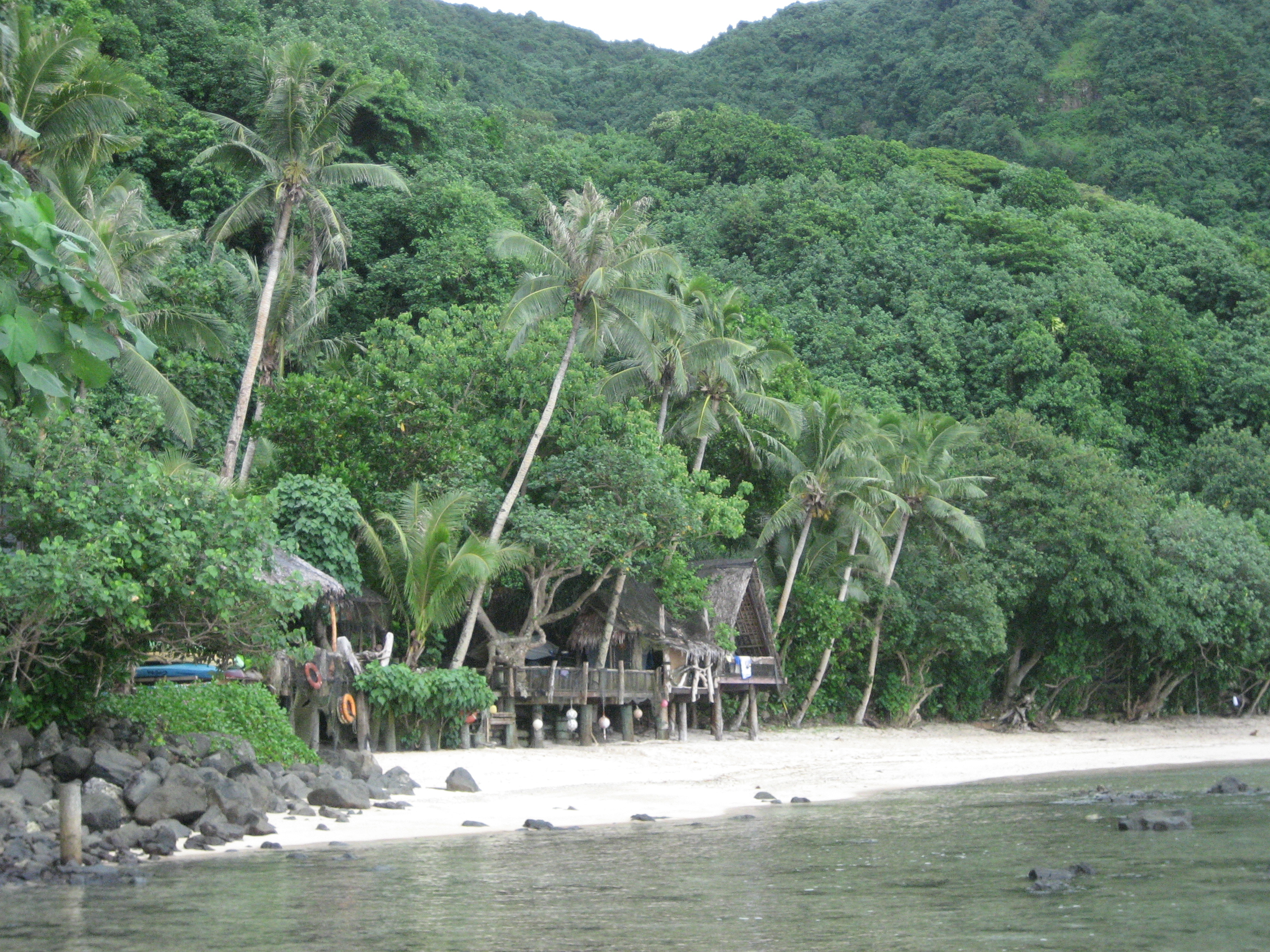
Tisa's Barefoot Bar

Alega is a small valley and embayment, situated along the south coast of Tutuila Island, in-between Pago Pago Bay in the west and Fagaitua Bay in the east. Only a few houses are located in Alega, all related to the Fa’amuli family. There are also foundation remains of houses occupied in the previous century. Alega's shoreline has a thin sandy beach, first and foremost on the east side. There is a developed reef in the Alega Bay with a channel which has a powerful current. The village is bounded by steep ridge slopes, and geologically, Alega sits in the midst of the Pago Volcanics, which were formed over a million years ago. The surrounding ridges are steep, falling between 30 and 40 degrees. Most of the Alega Valley was cleared and planted at one point, however, little cultivation remains, mostly coconuts and bananas. Most of the surrounding area is covered with trees and scrub.

Alega Beach has been named one of the best beaches in American Samoa by Lonely Planet. The fale at Tisa's Barefoot Bar has also been named “one of the best places to stay in American Samoa” by Lonely Planet.

== Demographics ==
Population growth
2020	29
2010	54
2000	54
1990	49
1980	30
