= Lutali =

Lutali is a surname. Notable people with the surname include:

- A. P. Lutali (1919–2002), governor of American Samoa
- Susana Leiato Lutali (1932–2012), American Samoan educator and politician, wife of A. P.
