= Muagututiʻa Moevasa Tauoa =

American Samoan politician

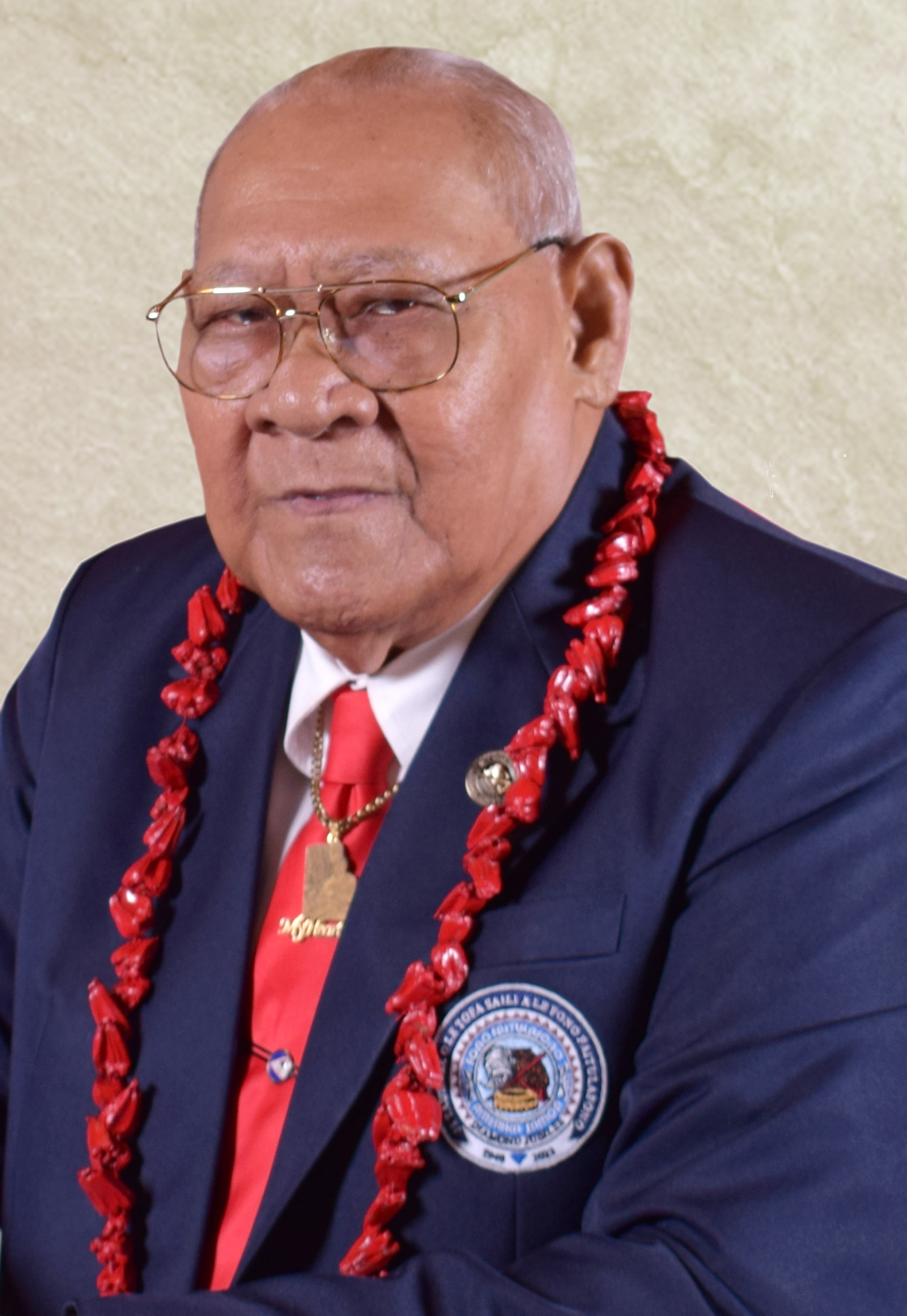

Member of the American Samoa Senate from the Suʻa County district
- Incumbent
- Assumed office 3 January 2017

Muagututiʻa Moevasa Tauoa is an American Samoan politician and member of the American Samoa Senate.

Muagututiʻa is from Fagaʻitua. He was elected to the Senate in November 2016. He was re-elected at the 2020 election.
