= Amaua, American Samoa =

Amaua
- Village
- Location within American Samoa
- Coordinates: 14°16′37″S 170°37′18″W
- Country: United States
- Territory: American Samoa
- County: Sua

Area
  - Total: 0.33 sq mi (0.86 km^{2})
- Elevation: 92 ft (28 m)

Population (2020)
  - Total: 68
  - Density: 200/sq mi (79/km^{2})
- Time zone: UTC−11 (Samoa Time Zone)
- ZIP code: 96799
- Area code: +1 684

Amaua is a village in the southeast of Tutuila Island, American Samoa located on the north shore of Faga'itua Bay between Alega and Faga'itua.

Amaua's mayor, Pulenu'u Troy Fia-ui, was taken into custody by the police in January 2011 after marijuana plants were discovered by his home.

As of 2010, Amaua had a 94.8 high school graduation percent, which was among the highest recorded of any village in American Samoa.

== Demographics ==
Year	Population
2020	68
2010	96
2000	102
1990	128
1980	90
