= Kaimiloa =

Hawaiian Royal Navy ship, 1887

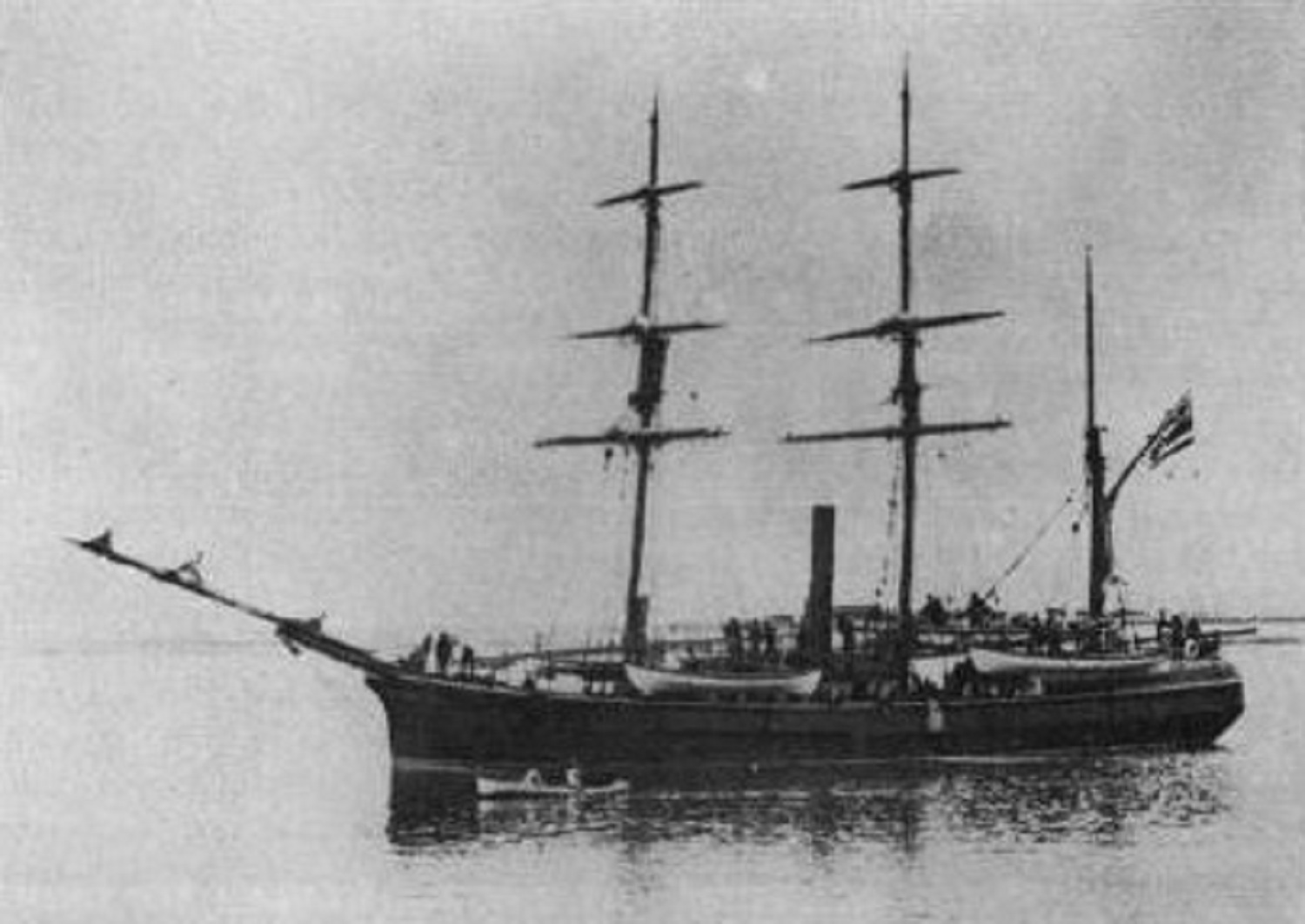
- Kaimiloa anchored at Honolulu.

History

Kingdom of Hawaii
- Name: HHMS Kaimiloa
- Cost: $20,000
- Commissioned: 28 March 1887
- Decommissioned: 30 August 1887
- Fate: Burned in 1910

General characteristics
- Class & type: Explorer gunboat
- Tons burthen: 170 tons
- Length: 127 feet 8 inches (38.91 m)
- Beam: 25 feet 3 inches (7.70 m)
- Draft: 11 feet 2 inches (3.40 m)
- Propulsion: Wind-powered sails; Steam engine (60hp)
- Speed: 8 knots (15 km/h; 9.2 mph)
- Complement: 67
- Armament: 4 × 4-inch cannons; 2 × Gatling guns

HHMS Kaimiloa was a warship of the Hawaiian Royal Navy. The ship was formerly the Explorer, a 170-ton schooner, built in England in 1871. Kaimiloa sailed from Hawaii to Samoa and other Pacific islands in 1887 in an effort by King Kalākaua to form a confederation of Polynesian states to counteract European imperialism. The instance nearly resulted in military conflict between the Kingdom of Hawaii and the German Empire, who viewed Samoa as their possession in the Pacific. It was also used as a training ship.

In the Hawaiian language, kaimiloa (from ka ʻimi loa) means "one who seeks afar" which roughly translates 'explorer'.

== Commissioning ==
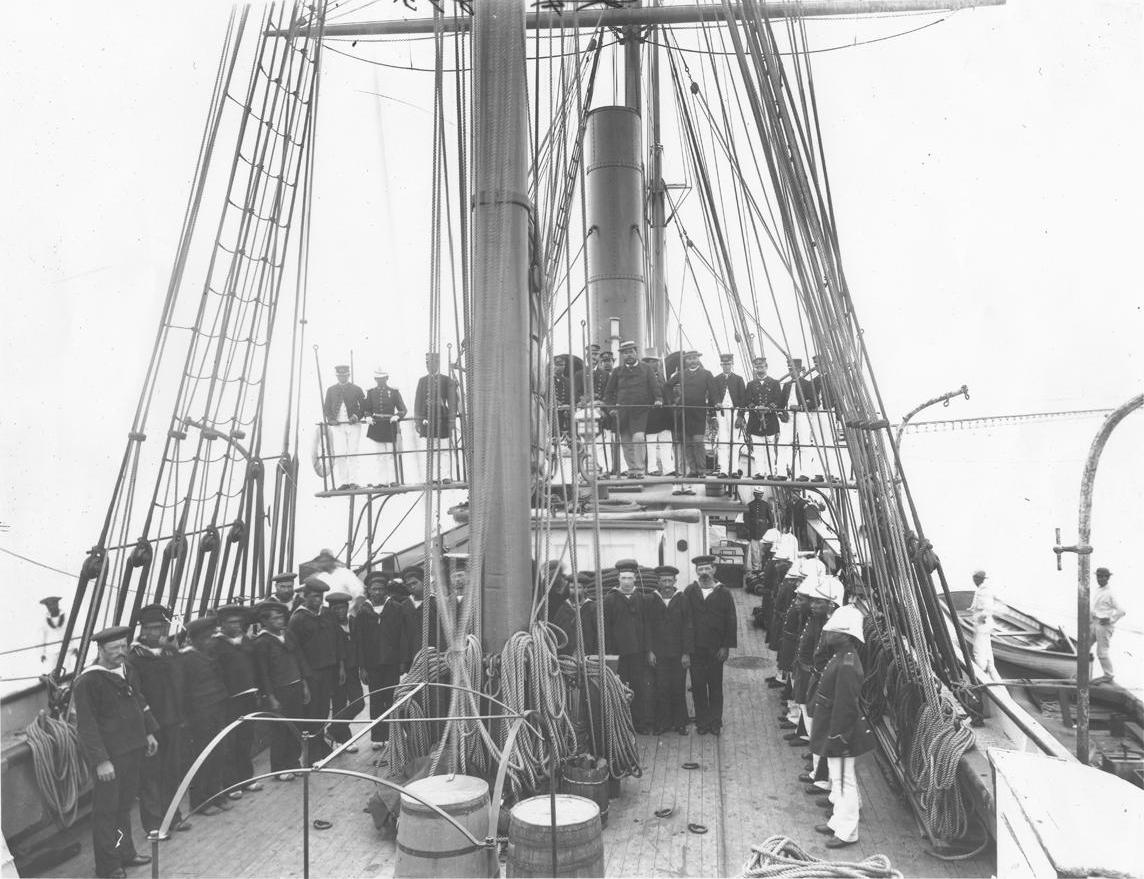
Kalakaua on the Kaimiloa

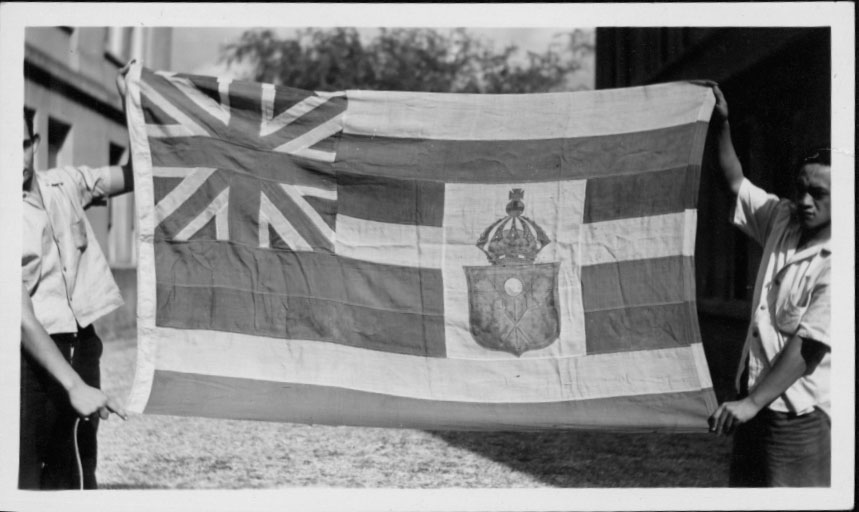
Isobel Strong designed a royal naval ensign similar to this for the Kaimiloa.

Walter M. Gibson had himself named secretary of the Navy, among his other titles. The navy owned mostly older sailing ships, tugboats, and traditional canoes. On January 22, 1887, Gibson convinced the government to purchase the Explorer, a 128-foot (39 m) British merchant steamer employed in the copra trade. The Explorer had been launched as Firebrick in Blyth, Northumberland in 1871. King Kalākaua bought the ship for $20,000 and added the rigging. After being refitted at great expense (over budget and behind schedule), the ship was renamed Kaimiloa and came into commission on 28 March 1887 and was ceremonially launched on April 20, 1887. Henri Berger composed a march in her honor.

Kaimiloa finally set sail on May 18, to serve as John E. Bush's flagship. The ship's captain was George E. Gresley Jackson. Twenty-four of the crew members were young Hawaiians who were enrolled in reform school, and who were placed on the ship's crew with only one month of training. Due to the music program which was in effect at the reform school, some of these crew members were also members of a military band. They were led by Charles Palikapu Kaleikoa, who was a member of the Royal Hawaiian Band.

== Voyage ==
Seeking an alliance with Samoa, Kaimiloa set sail on May 18, 1887, and reached Apia on June 16. However, due to Samoa already being in negotiations with the German Empire, and the United Kingdom and United States of America also keeping track of the situation, talks did not progress well. During these negotiations, the military band held a concert for the townspeople of Apia, which helped to build up good relations between them and the Hawaiians. There were few problems caused by the crew, with only one incident that required reprimand being on record.

Due to the effects of the coup d'état that happened in July 1887, the ship was ordered to return home on August 23. They arrived in Honolulu on September 23. This was the only voyage conducted by Kaimiloa for the Hawaiian navy. The crew were disbanded on August 29, and the ship was decommissioned on August 30. After this, Charles Palikapu Kaleikoa reformed the Royal Hawaiian Band and continued to play in it until his retirement 40 years later.

Later on, the Samoan crisis evolved into the Samoan Civil War (1887–1889) with rival colonial powers supporting different chiefs as kings of Samoa.

=== Aunuʻu Island ===
In 1887, the Kaimiloa made a notable stop at Aunuʻu Island. While the ship was docked at the island, two Hawaiian sailors, Aniani and Mahelona, deserted the ship, taking with them weapons, including rifles and cannons. These weapons would later become instrumental in fortifying Aunuʻu against external threats during a period of political turmoil during the Samoan Civil War. Aunuʻu became a haven for refugees fleeing the conflict on Tutuila, prompting its residents to prepare for potential attacks. With the help of the two Hawaiian deserters and a Hawaiian-descended storekeeper named Manoa, the villagers of Aunuʻu constructed defensive positions. They fortified the island with the Kaimiloa's cannons and rifles and strategically placed ambush points along the coral reefs. When an invasion fleet from Tutuila attempted to attack, the defenders successfully repelled the assault, securing Aunuʻu's safety. Oral histories on Aunuʻu continue to honor the alliance formed during this turbulent period, and one of its cannons is now housed at the Jean P. Haydon Museum in Pago Pago, American Samoa.

== After decommissioning ==
After being decommissioned, Kaimiloa was used as a quarantine ship, but in 1888 it was sold for 2,800 dollars and used as a transportation vessel between the Hawaiian Islands.

In 1894, the Gatling guns were removed by the administration of the Republic of Hawaii. Later, the steam engine was also removed and used by the sugar industry. Kaimiloa was then used to transport coal and oil. In 1910, the hull was burned.
