= Alao, American Samoa =

Alao
- Village
- Location within American Samoa
- Coordinates: 14°16′3″S 170°33′49″W
- Country: United States
- Territory: American Samoa
- County: Vaifanua

Area
  - Total: 0.56 sq mi (1.45 km^{2})

Population (2020)
  - Total: 275
  - Density: 491/sq mi (190/km^{2})

Alao is a village on the narrow east coast of Tutuila Island, American Samoa. It is located close to the island's easternmost point, just to the north of Aunu'u Island. Alao is home to white sand beaches, and is one of the oldest settlements in all of American Samoa. It is located in Vaifanua County, American Samoa.

The village gained international attention in 2005 when the village council moved to ban Asian-owned businesses within village boundaries. Its ranking chief, Sogimaletavai Leo, told reporters that the village wanted to protect small Samoan-owned businesses. He also explained that it has been an increased number of Asian-owned stores popping up in neighboring villages on the island's east end.

Olomoana Hill behind Alao is one of very few places in Tutuila where trachyte occurs.

A chapel of the Church of Jesus Christ of Latter-day Saints (LDS Church) is located in town.

== History ==
In the late 19th century, the village of Alao became the first foothold for the LDS Church on Tutuila Island.

In 1929, author Aletta Lewis (1904-1955) spent six months in the Samoan Islands and lived for a time with families in Alao. In her travelogue They Call Them Savages (1938), she recalls Alao and its people with warmth, stressing the “good feeling” she found in Samoan life and culture.

== Demographics ==
Population growth
2020	275
2010	495
2000	528
1990	463
1980	274
1970	390
1960	386
1950	324
1940	195
1930	138

== Geography ==
Alao is situated near the southeastern tip of Tutuila Island, where the hamlet of Utumea is located. There is a white sand beach that stretches the whole length of the village of Alao.

== Notable people ==
- Jack Thompson, entrepreneur.
