= First Lady of American Samoa =

Governor of American Samoa's wife

- Seal of American Samoa
- Incumbent; Ella Mauga since January 3, 2021
- Term length: 4 Years

The First Lady of American Samoa is the title attributed to the wife of the governor of American Samoa. To date, there have been no first gentlemen of American Samoa.

The current first lady is Ella Mauga, wife of Governor Lemanu Peleti Mauga, who has held the position since January 3, 2021.

== List of first ladies of American Samoa ==
=== First ladies of Naval governors (1900–1951) ===
First Lady	Term begins	Term ends	Governor of American Samoa	Notes
Natalie Blauvelt Milne	January 20, 1936	June 3, 1938	MacGillivray Milne	Mrs. Milne made a direct appeal to Eleanor Roosevelt, requesting increased federal aid for public health.
Elizabeth Ammons Larsen	January 12, 1942	April 25, 1942	Henry Louis Larsen	
Vera Allen Houser	September 10, 1945	April 22, 1947	Harold Houser	
Ida Brown	April 22, 1947	June 15, 1949	Vernon Huber	

=== First ladies of Civilian governors (1951–1978) ===
First Lady	Term begins	Term ends	Governor of American Samoa	Notes
Emma Louise Lowe	October 1, 1953	October 15, 1956	Richard Barrett Lowe	Also First Lady of Guam from 1956 to 1959
Nora Stewart Coleman	October 15, 1956	May 24, 1961	Peter Tali Coleman	Stewart Coleman, who was from Hawaii, was the first woman from the Pacific Islands to serve as first lady of American Samoa.
Taotafa Lutu Aspinall	August 1, 1967	July 31, 1969	Owen Aspinall	First Samoan first lady of American Samoa
Jean P. Haydon	August 1, 1969	October 14, 1974	John Morse Haydon	Established the Jean P. Haydon Museum in Pago Pago
?	October 15, 1974	February 6, 1975	Frank Mockler	
Jane Wylie Ruth	February 6, 1975	September 30, 1976	Earl B. Ruth	Jane’s health problems led Governor Ruth to step down after just 1,5 years.
Carolyn Barnett	October 1, 1976	May 27, 1977	Frank Barnett	
Lillian Lee	May 28, 1977	January 3, 1978	H. Rex Lee	

=== First ladies of elected governors (1978–present) ===
First Lady	Term begins	Term ends	Governor of American Samoa	Notes
Nora Stewart Coleman	January 3, 1978	January 3, 1985	Peter Tali Coleman	
Susana Leiato Lutali	January 3, 1985	January 2, 1989	A. P. Lutali	
Nora Stewart Coleman	January 2, 1989	January 3, 1993	Peter Tali Coleman	
Susana Leiato Lutali	January 3, 1993	January 3, 1997	A. P. Lutali	
Fagaoalii Satele Sunia	January 3, 1997	March 26, 2003	Tauese Sunia	
Mary Ann Tulafono	March 26, 2003	January 3, 2013	Togiola Tulafono	
Cynthia Malala Moliga	January 3, 2013	January 3, 2021	Lolo Matalasi Moliga	
Ella Perefoti Mauga	January 3, 2021	Present	Lemanu Peleti Mauga	

== See also ==
- List of governors of American Samoa
