= Lau'agae Ridge Quarry =

Archaeological site in American Samoa

- U.S. National Register of Historic Places
- Nearest city: Tula, American Samoa
- Area: 3.1 acres (1.3 ha)
- NRHP reference No.: 99001227
- Added to NRHP: March 30, 2000

The Lau'agae Ridge Quarry is a prehistoric stone quarry on the eastern side of the island of Tutuila in the United States territory of American Samoa. It is located on a ridge above another archaeological site, the prehistoric village of Tulauta. The quarry site was listed on the National Register of Historic Places in 2000.

== Description ==
The site includes a carpet of stone flakes, evidence of rough stonework (creating forms probably finished in Tulauta), signs of habitation, and two tia'ave, oval stone platforms found in abundance on the island.

== See also ==
- National Register of Historic Places listings in American Samoa
