= Fagaoalii Satele Sunia =

American Samoan literacy advocate and educator

First Lady of American Samoa
- In role January 3, 1997 – March 26, 2003
- Governor: Tauese Sunia
- Preceded by: Susana Leiato Lutali
- Succeeded by: Mary Ann Tulafono

Personal details
- Born: Fagaoalii Lefagaoali'i Satele; August 3, 1946; Lefagaoalii, Savaii, Western Samoa Trust Territory
- Died: September 5, 2015 (aged 69); Faga'alu, American Samoa
- Resting place: Tauese P. Sunia Memorial; Fogāgogo, American Samoa
- Spouse: Tauese Sunia (m. 1969; died 2003)
- Children: 10

Fagaoalii Lefagaoali'i Satele Sunia (c. 1946 – September 5, 2015) was an American Samoan literacy advocate and educator. She served as the First Lady of American Samoa from January 1997 to March 2003 during the tenure of her husband, former Governor Tauese Sunia, who died in office in 2003. Sunia established and operated the Read to Me Samoa Program to promote reading in American Samoa. She also created the Tauese P. Sunia Memorial, a museum and visitor attraction dedicated to her late husband located at her home in Tutuila.

Sunia was one of the few women to be ordained a deacon in the Congregational Christian Church in American Samoa.

== Biography ==
=== Early and personal life ===
Born Lefagaoali'i Satele, Sunia was named after Lefagaoalii, the village where she was born on the island of Savaii, Western Samoa Trust Territory (the present-day Independent State of Samoa). She was the oldest of her parents' eleven children. Her parents, Le Alo o Salamasina Satele Mosegi and Mata’ia Avaiu Mauigoa-Satele, were Christian ministers for the London Missionary Society from the village of Vailoatai in Western District, American Samoa. The London Missionary Society is now known as the Congregational Christian Church in American Samoa and Samoa.

She initially attended school in American Samoa, but graduated from Waipahu High School in Waipahu, Hawaii. She returned to American Samoa, where she was hired for her first job at the territory's Department of the American Samoa Government, now known as the territory's Office of Communications. She then enrolled in, and graduated from, nursing school and became a nurse at LBJ Tropical Medical Center.

Sunia married her husband, future Governor Tauese Piti Sunia, in 1969; the couple had ten children. The Sunias moved back to American Samoa in 1981 at settled in the village of Leone, American Samoa.

Fagaoalii Sunia held several honorary titles, including Leilua, Lomialagi and Sina.

=== First Lady of American Samoa ===
Sunia served as the First Lady of American Samoa from 1997 to 2003 during the two gubernatorial terms of Governor Tauese Sunia, a former schoolteacher. She championed efforts to promote reading and literacy in the territory, including the Read to Me Samoa Program, which she founded and operated. Governor Sunia died in office on March 26, 2003, while en route from Apia, Samoa, to Honolulu on board a Polynesian Airlines flight to seek treatment for abdominal pains. First Lady Sunia was accompanying her husband on the flight at the time.

Following the Governor's death, Sunia devoted much of her time to her family and her church, the Congregational Christian Church in American Samoa (CCCAS) in Leone, American Samoa. Governor Sunia had been a CCCAS deacon. Fagaoalii Satele Sunia was ordained as deacon to succeed her late husband, making her one of the few female deacons in the Congregational Christian Church (CCCAS) denomination. Additionally, she was a member of the CCCAS' Women's Fellowship.

She also established the Tauese P. Sunia Memorial, a memorial and museum at her home in Fogāgogo, which became a tourist attraction.

Sunia suffered a stroke shortly after midnight on August 30, 2015. She was admitted to Lyndon B. Johnson Tropical Medical Center in Faga'alu on Monday morning, August 31, 2015. Sunia suffered a second stroke on the afternoon of August 31 and lapsed into a coma.

Fagaoalii Satele Sunia died from complications of her strokes at LBJ Tropical Medical Center in Faga'alu on September 5, 2015, at the age of 69. She was survived by 8 of her 10 children and ten siblings.

Fagaoalii Sunia's funeral was held at the Leone Roman Catholic Church, near her CCCAS church, on September 25, 2015. Dignitaries in attendance included American Samoan and Samoan relatives, former First Ladies and politicians. Her casket, which was draped in the flag of American Samoa, was accompanied by territorial police officers. Sunia was buried next to her late husband at her home in Fogāgogo, American Samoa.

Senator Timusa Tini Lam Yuen sponsored a house concurrent resolution honoring the former First Lady in the American Samoa Fono.
