= Jean P. Haydon =

First Lady of American Somoa (1923–2000)

Jean Parker Haydon (1923–2000) served as the First Lady of American Samoa from August 1, 1969, to October 14, 1974. Born in Yakima, Washington, she married John Morse Haydon in Seattle in 1941. They had three daughters, Marti H. Jones, Molly Kramer, and Rusty Nicholson, and a son, John Robert Haydon. After her husband's governorship, the couple returned to West Seattle in 1974, where they opened an art gallery and plant shop.

Jean Haydon was active in the arts community, serving on the Washington State Arts Council. She is best remembered for initiating a program to record and preserve Samoan culture. She transformed the lower half of the Government House, the official residence, into American Samoa's first museum, making it accessible to ordinary Samoans. As a full-time volunteer, she established an arts council and American Samoa's first regional museum.

When Apollo 13 returned to Earth on April 17, 1970, landing in the Pacific Ocean near American Samoa, Governor Haydon and Jean welcomed the astronauts at Pago Pago International Airport. Jean Haydon gifted each astronaut a length of tapa, a traditional Samoan cloth, for their wives.

Jean Haydon played a crucial role in starting a collection of Samoan crafts, art, and cultural artifacts. This collection was initially kept on the first floor of the Government House and later formed the basis of the Museum of American Samoa in Fagotogo. Before Governor Haydon's term ended in 1974, the Legislature honored Jean by renaming the museum the Jean P. Haydon Museum.

Jean Haydon quickly organized the museum, which officially opened on January 1, 1970, just a few months after her arrival in Tutuila on August 3, 1969. Despite her initial lack of knowledge about global collections of Samoan material culture, Jean passionately believed in the significance of their collection. She expressed this in a letter to Congresswoman Julia Butler Hansen on August 9, 1971, claiming they had the most comprehensive collection of Samoan artifacts in the world.
