= Sacred Hearts Academy =

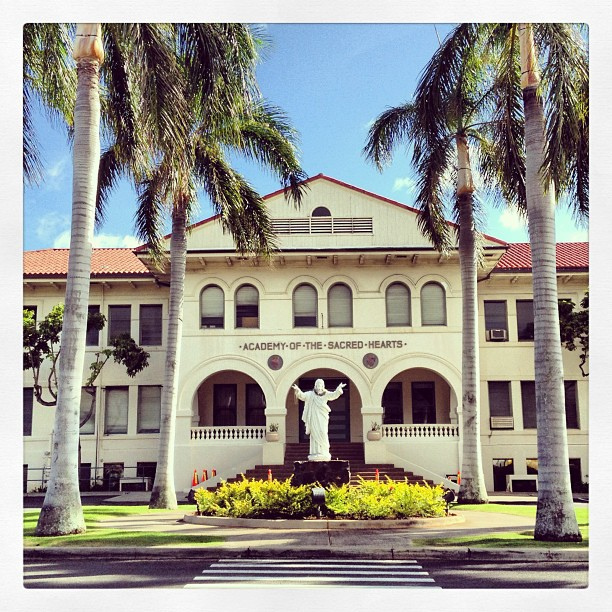

Location
- 3253 Waiʻalae Avenue; Honolulu, Hawaiʻi 96816; United States
- 21°17′20″N 157°48′28″W

Information
- Type: Private
- Motto: Orare Et Laborare (To Pray and To Work)
- Religious affiliation: Catholic Church (Sacred Hearts)
- Established: 1909
- Head of school: Dr. Brandy Sato
- Grades: JK-12
- Gender: Girls
- Enrollment: 600 (2022)
- Colors: White and Gold
- Athletics conference: ILH
- Team name: Lancers
- Accreditation: Western Association of Schools and Colleges
- Newspaper: Kaleo
- Yearbook: Ke Halia
- Tuition: Approximately $17,000-$20,000
- Affiliation: Congregation of the Sacred Hearts of Jesus and Mary
- Registrar: Cyril Pires
- Director of Admissions: Tiffany Kiyabu Nishimura, '03
- Athletic Director: Ryan Hogue
- Director of Alumnae Affairs: Tiffany Kiyabu Nishimura, '03
- Website: www.sacredhearts.org

Sacred Hearts Academy, also known as Sacred Hearts or SHA, is located on 3253 Waiʻalae Avenue, in the town of Kaimuki in Honolulu, Hawaiʻi, is a historic Roman Catholic college preparatory school for girls founded in 1909 to serve the needs of early Hawaiʻi Catholics in the former Territory of Hawaiʻi. The school maintains a special relationship with Chaminade University of Honolulu and the all-boys Saint Louis School, both administered by the Society of Mary.

== History ==
Sacred Hearts was originally founded by nuns from the Congregation of the Sacred Hearts of Jesus and Mary, the religious order of Father Damien. The precursor of the institution was founded as a boarding and day school next to the Cathedral Basilica of Our Lady of Peace in Honolulu in 1859.

The current manifestation was founded in 1909 as a boarding school, it grew rapidly within the next decade and, by the 1920s, more buildings were added to accommodate the students. The sisters ran the school until 1990, when it passed into lay administration.

== Filming location ==
Sacred Hearts has served as a filming location for several television shows set and shot on location in Hawaii. The season 6 finale of the ABC series Lost was filmed there. In Hawaii Five-0, Sacred Hearts was used as Grace Williams' school.

== Alumnae ==
- Tia Carrere, actress, singer and model
- Nora Stewart Coleman, former First Lady of American Samoa
- Amata Coleman Radewagen, Congressional delegate from American Samoa
- Loretta Fuddy, director of the Hawaii Department of Health (2011–2013)
- Elizabeth Kahanu Kalanianaʻole, Hawaiian princess
- Rosalie Keliʻinoi, first elected female Hawaii Territorial legislator in 1925
- Jean King, first woman to serve as Lieutenant Governor of Hawai'i (1978–1982)
- Likelike, Hawaiian princess
- Emma Kaili Metcalf Beckley Nakuina, early female judge and cultural writer of Hawaii
- Faith Rivera, singer-songwriter
- Shanlyn A. S. Park, Judge, U.S District Court for the District of Hawaii

== See also ==
- Roman Catholic Diocese of Honolulu
