= Saint Patrick Catholic Church, Honolulu =

Roman Catholic parish in Kaimuki, Hawaii

Coordinates: 21.285102°N 157.805183°W

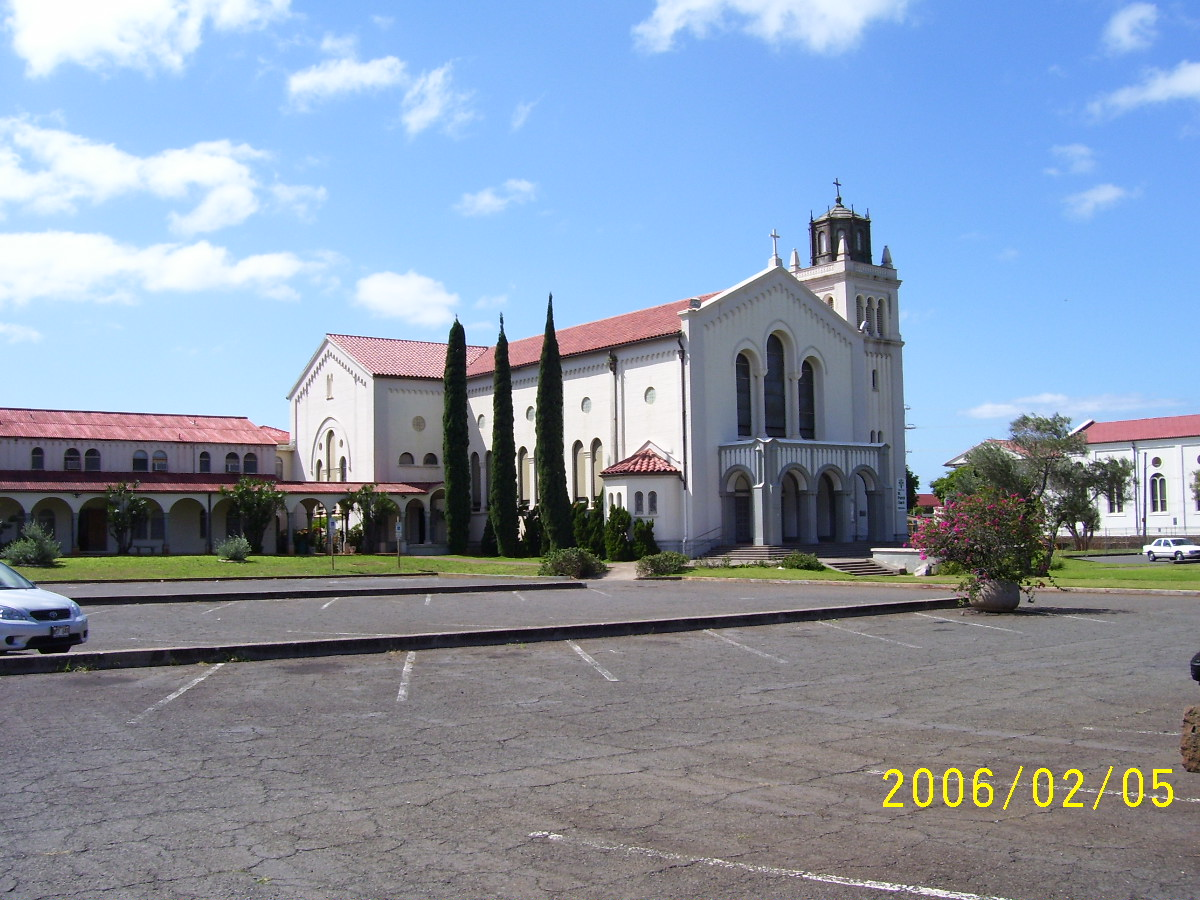
Saint Patrick Roman Catholic Church in Kaimuki, Hawai‘i

Saint Patrick Catholic Church, Honolulu is a parish in the Kaimuki district, in the East Honolulu Vicariate of the Roman Catholic Diocese of Honolulu, Hawaii. The church was consecrated under the title of St. Patrick, Bishop of Armagh. Its Romanesque architecture, as well as its fine ecclesiastical appointments such as stained glass windows and pipe organ, are attractive to prospective couples seeking nuptial rites.

Although it falls under the jurisdiction of the Bishop of Honolulu, the parish is owned by the Fathers and Brothers of the Sacred Hearts (Picpus) through papal indult and in recognition of the missionary efforts of the Picpus congregation in establishing the church in the Hawaiian Islands. The church is frequently the site of religious professions, ordinations and obsequies for the members of the Hawaiian Province of the Picpus congregation.

== Church, Monastery and Rectory ==
Msgr. Libert Boeynaems, SS.CC., Bishop of the Titular See of Zeugma and Vicar Apostolic of the Hawaiian Islands, acquired the land on dry, rocky volcanic slope of Kaimuki for a church in 1901. Meanwhile, the Sisters of the Sacred Hearts acquired a lot just west of the church lot and in 1909 had their convent and their school (Academy of the Sacred Hearts of Jesus and Mary) blessed. By 1917, Kaimuki was developed and the convent chapel, dedicated under the title of Saint Margaret Mary Alacoque was open to the public for Sunday worship. A church was needed and the Vicar Apostolic instructed Father Athanasius Bous, SS.CC., to initiate work on building a new church for Kaimuki, securing the services of architect, R. A. Fishbourne. A Romanesque cruciform structure was completed in 1929 and was solemnly dedicated on February 10, 1929, by Msgr. Stephen Peter Alencastre, SS.CC., Bishop of the Titular See of Arabissus and the (final) Vicar Apostolic of the Hawaiian Islands. The church was furnished with stained glass windows and two bells from Brussels. Statues, altars, pulpit and vestments were donated by parishioners. With the installation of a pipe organ, the church was complete.

Following the Second World War, Father Andrew LaRiviere, SS.CC., transformed the front of the church property into an open space suitable for parking on Sundays. In 1935 a passing Benedictine monk drew a set of plans for a monastery for the priests and brothers of the Sacred Hearts congregation. The plan came to fruition and a monastery-rectory consonant with the church's Romanesque architecture served the church until 1963, when pastor Father Albert Leunens, SS.CC., constructed a new rectory in the Romanesque style made separate from the monastery.

Fr. Clyde Gurriero, ss.cc. is the current Pastor. Fr. Bertram Lock, ss.cc. is the current Parochial Vicar. Fr. Micheal Kumar, ss.cc is the current Parochial Vicar.

== School ==
A school was opened in September 1930, built with wood salvaged from the old Saint Louis College on River Street. The school was staffed by the Sisters of the Sacred Hearts and started with three grades. Eventually, the school consisted of eight grades and a kindergarten. With the increasing population in Kaimuki, the school was expanded to a double school in 1943, due to the efforts of two carpenter religious, Brothers Sylvester Barbe, SS.CC., and Wenceslaus Van Vorst, SS.CC. In January 1950, a fire destroyed the auditorium and all but two classrooms. Father Lawrence Mampaey, SS.CC., immediately set out to rebuild the school with the assistance of volunteers and parishioners. By summer of 1950, a new 16-classroom building designed by architect Edwin L. Bauer and built by Pacific Construction Company was showcased during an open house.

== Today ==
The parish school is currently staffed by the Congregation of the Sacred Hearts and lay staff. Sister Anne Clare De Costa, SS.CC., is the principal. The parish is administered by Fathers and Brothers of the Sacred Hearts. The current pastor of the parish is Father Clyde Guerreiro, SS.CC., assisted by parochial vicars Fathers Bertram Lock, SS.CC., and Father Micheal Kumar, SS.CC. The parish and the school have recently celebrated their 75th anniversaries, and a major capital improvement plan for the school and parish is in development.

The school has launched a three-year program to restructure the teaching learning environment. The program called "Learning for All", is based on the spirit of the Sacred Hearts, effective school research, cooperative learning and teachers as leaders.
