= Auto, American Samoa =

Auto
- Village
- Location within American Samoa
- Coordinates: 14°16′59″S 170°37′37″W
- Country: United States
- Territory: American Samoa
- County: Sua

Area
  - Total: 0.32 sq mi (0.83 km^{2})
- Elevation: 213 ft (65 m)

Population (2020)
  - Total: 214
  - Density: 670/sq mi (260/km^{2})

Auto is a village in the east of Tutuila Island, American Samoa. It is located at the western end of Faga'itua Bay, immediately east of Alega.

Auto Valley is situated near the entrance of Faga'itua Bay. To the northwest of the valley, Palapala Mountain rises to an elevation of 395 meters.

It is home to ancient burial sites.

== Demographics ==
| Year | Population |
|---|---|
| 2020 | 214 |
| 2010 | 262 |
| 2000 | 258 |
| 1990 | 255 |
| 1980 | 201 |
| 1970 | 153 |
| 1960 | 70 |

== See also ==
- Amaua and Auto Village Marine Protected Area
