= Tulauta Village Site =

- Tulauta Village
- U.S. National Register of Historic Places
- Location: Tula, American Samoa
- Area: 4 acres (1.6 ha)
- NRHP reference No.: 87001980
- Added to NRHP: June 2, 1997

The Tulauta Village Site is a prehistoric village site (local archaeological designation AS-21-1) in far eastern Tutuila, the largest island of American Samoa. The site includes 10-13 house sites, a number of grave site, and other features, including stone enclosures interpreted as pig sties, fire pits, and walls. An upright basalt slab was found, which may have been of local religious significance. Early archaeological testing took place here in the 1970s, with more extensive examinations in the 1980s and 1990s. A large number of basalt stone flakes (evidence of stone tool construction) led an early researcher to speculate that it was a quarry site; it is more likely the inhabitants were working stone quarried from a site on the ridge above.

The site was listed on the National Register of Historic Places in 1997.

== See also ==
- National Register of Historic Places listings in American Samoa
