= Emma Louise Lowe =

American musician, educator (1902–1995)

First Lady of American Samoa
- In role October 1, 1953 – October 15, 1956
- Governor: Richard Barrett Lowe
- Succeeded by: Nora Stewart Coleman

First Lady of Guam
- In role October 15, 1956 – November 14, 1959
- Governor: Richard Barrett Lowe

Personal details
- Born: 1902 Ottumwa, Iowa, US
- Died: 1995 (aged 92–93) Manassas, Virginia, US
- Party: Republican
- Spouse: Richard Barrett Lowe
- Children: 2
- Education: Drake University Conservatory of Music
- Occupation: Musician, Educator, First Lady of American Samoa and First Lady of Guam

Emma Louise Lowe was an American musician, educator, former First Lady of American Samoa and former First Lady of Guam.

== Early life ==
In 1902, Lowe was born in Ottumwa, Iowa.

== Education ==
Lowe earned a degree from Drake University Conservatory of Music in Des Moines, Iowa.

== Career ==
Lowe was a violinist with a musical ensemble on the Chautauqua Circuit in the Midwest. Lowe was also a pianist. Lowe became a music instructor at Eastern State Teachers College in South Dakota.

In 1953, when Richard Barrett Lowe was appointed by President Dwight D. Eisenhower as the Governor of American Samoa, Lowe became the First Lady of Sāmoa on October 1, 1953, until October 15, 1956.

In 1956, when Richard Barrett Lowe was appointed by President Dwight D. Eisenhower as the Governor of Guam, Lowe became the First Lady of Guam on October 15, 1956, until November 14, 1959.

Lowe and her husband restored old houses in Alexandria, Virginia.

== Personal life ==
Lowe's husband was Richard Barrett Lowe (1902–1972), an educator, Governor of American Samoa, and Governor of Guam. They had two sons, Bruce A. Lowe (1926–2015) and Cameron A. Lowe (1932–2020). Lowe and her family lived in Madison, South Dakota, Alcester, South Dakota, Wessington Springs, South Dakota, American Samoa, and Guam.

In 1953, Lowe and her family lived in America Samoa. In 1956, Lowe and her family lived Guam.

Lowe lived in a replica of George Washington's house at 508 Cameron St, Alexandria, Virginia, until 1990.

On December 27, 1995, Lowe died of cardiac arrest at the Caton Merchant House retirement facility in Manassas, Virginia. Lowe is interred at Graceland Cemetery in Madison, South Dakota.
