= Onenoa, American Samoa =

Onenoa is a village located in the northeast of Tutuila Island in Vaifanua County in the Eastern District. It is situated near Ogefao and Lauagae. It is the last village on the road of the eastern frontal side of the island. The road leading to Onenoa traverses a steep mountain ridge before descending into the village. The village has 100 residents as of the 2020 United States census.

== Etymology ==
The name of the village, Onenoa, is derived from the Samoan language and translates into English as “Sand Waste".

== History ==
Archaeological evidence suggests the possible remains of an ancient fort near Onenoa. Historically, such fortifications were built to protect against Tongan marauders or rival Samoan raiding parties during periods of internal conflict.

== Geography ==
The village is situated in a region characterized by high cliffs, small plantations, and forested slopes. On a coastal bluff above Onenoa lies the only significant area of Kula (tula) fernland in American Sāmoa, covering slightly more than one hectare. A smaller patch of similar vegetation exists on a coastal bluff at Atauloma on the island's southwest coast.

== Government ==
It is located in a highly traditional area. On March 3, 1996, it was reported in Samoa News that the Onenoa Village Council had passed a new set of ‘Sa’ laws. Males with long hair and unmarried couples living together were no longer allowed to reside in the village. From 6:45 pm to 7 pm, no one was allowed to travel within the village, and a strict 10 pm overall curfew was established. The council banned all parties involving alcoholic beverages, which were prohibited at all times. Loud clapping, yelling, and fighting were also forbidden. Swimming was prohibited on Sundays, as was doing laundry, except between the hours of 6 pm and 9:15 pm.
