= John Morse Haydon =

American Samoan politician

John Haydon

Governor of American Samoa
- In office August 1, 1969 – October 14, 1974
- Preceded by: Owen Aspinall
- Succeeded by: Frank Mockler

Personal details
- Born: January 27, 1920 Billings, Montana, U.S.
- Died: April 18, 1991 (aged 71) Olympia, Washington, U.S.
- Party: Republican
- Spouse: Jean P. Haydon
- Education: University of Washington, Seattle

Military service
- Allegiance: United States
- Branch/service: United States Army Air Forces
- Rank: First Lieutenant
- Battles/wars: World War II

John Morse Haydon (January 27, 1920 – April 18, 1991) was the governor of American Samoa from 1969 to 1974. Haydon attended the University of Washington. He served as a First Lieutenant in the United States Army Air Forces during World War II and flew 35 combat missions over Germany. Haydon was commissioner of the Seattle Port Commission from 1960 to 1969, and president in 1963, 1968, and 1969. He was a member of the Governor's Advisory Council on Fisheries from 1965 to 1967, and on Commerce and Economic Development from 1965 to 1969. On August 1, 1969, he was appointed governor of American Samoa by the Interior Secretary and he served until October 1974.

Haydon served as the publisher of the Marine Digest, a marine magazine based in Seattle, and played an active role in President Richard Nixon's presidential campaign. As governor of American Samoa, Haydon opposed the election of governors by Samoans, asserting that no Samoan was qualified for the position. The American Civil Liberties Union charged Haydon with violating the Hatch Act, leading to a federal administrative judge holding hearings in Fagatogo and ruling against him. As a result, the Department of the Interior recalled Haydon in 1974. Haydon also attempted to expel the managing editor of Samoa News, and was later accused of interfering in local elections.

His wife, First Lady Jean P. Haydon, initiated a collection of Samoan artifacts that eventually became the foundation of the Jean P. Haydon Museum.

Government offices
Preceded by Owen Stuart Aspinall	Governor of American Samoa; 1969-1974	Succeeded by Frank C. Mockler
