= Frank Mockler =

American politician

Frank Carpenter Mockler (April 4, 1909 – November 16, 1993) was an American attorney who served as the governor of American Samoa. Mockler was the county attorney for Fremont County, Wyoming. He was Speaker of the Wyoming House of Representatives in 1951 as a Republican. He was Secretary of American Samoa under John Morse Haydon. Mockler took the office of Governor of American Samoa on October 15, 1974, and ended his term on February 6, 1975. After leaving the governor's seat, Mockler moved to Longboat Key, Florida.

Mockler served as Lieutenant Governor under Governor John Morse Haydon. When Haydon was recalled for interfering in the gubernatorial election process, Mockler was appointed Governor with the understanding that his term would last only a few months.
