= Jean P. Haydon Museum =

- Navy Building 43
- U.S. National Register of Historic Places
- U.S. Historic district – Contributing property
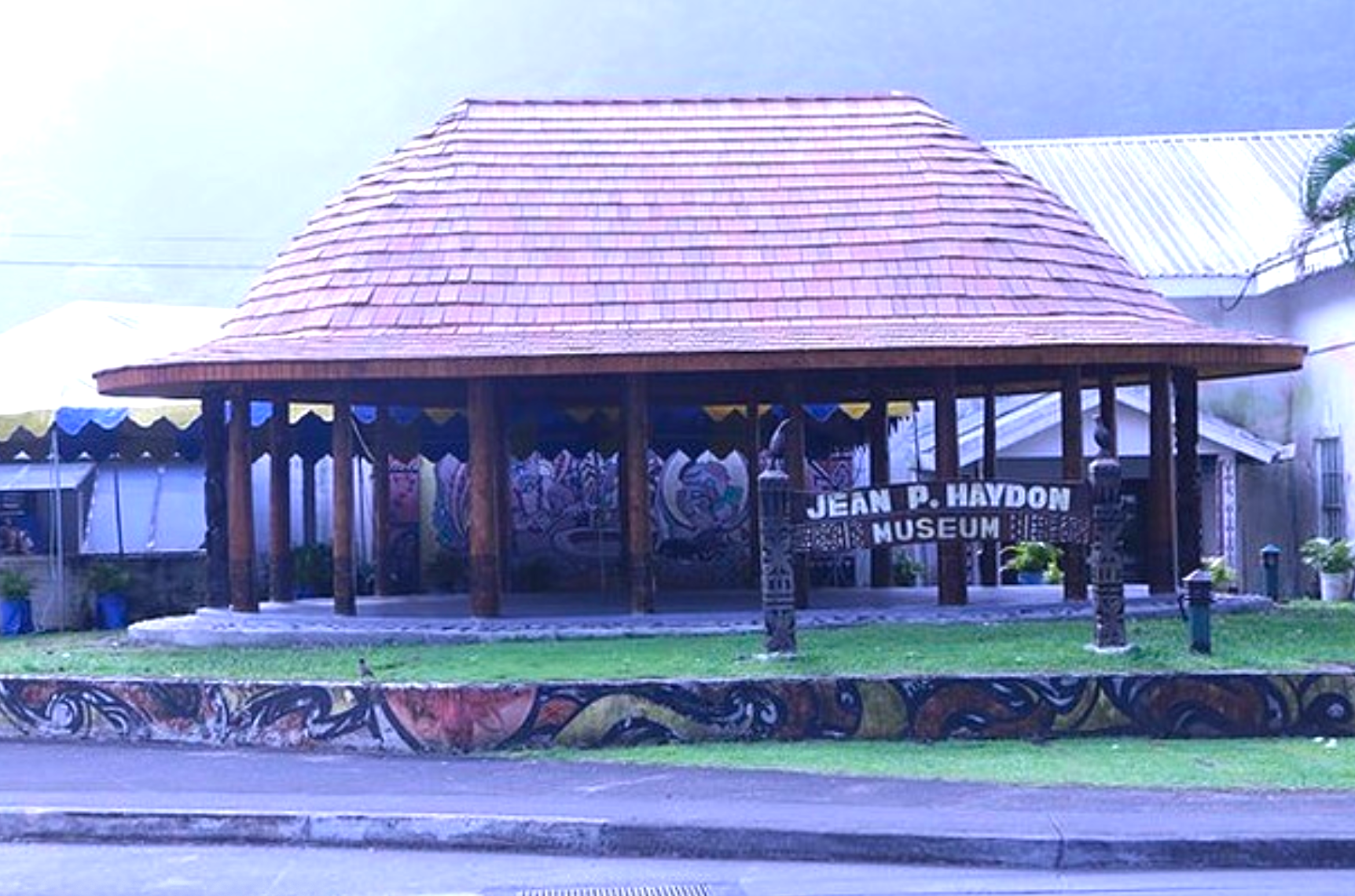

- Location within American Samoa
- Location: Pago Pago Harbor, Fagatogo, American Samoa
- Coordinates: 14.2778°S 170.6878°W
- Area: 0.1 acres (0.040 ha)
- Built: 1917
- Architectural style: Tropical architecture
- Part of: U.S. Naval Station Tutuila Historic District (ID90000854)
- NRHP reference No.: 72001442

Significant dates
- Added to NRHP: March 16, 1972
- Designated CP: June 20, 1990

The Jean P. Haydon Museum is a museum in Pago Pago dedicated to the culture and history of the United States territory of American Samoa. It contains a collection of canoes, coconut-shell combs, pigs’ tusk armlets and native pharmacopoeia. It also houses exhibits on natural history, tapa making, traditional tattooing, as well as a collection of war clubs, kava bowls, and historic photographs. Constructed in 1913 as U.S. Naval Station Tutuila Commissary, the building was home to Tutuila Island's Post Office from 1950 to 1971. The museum has displays of various aspects of the Samoan Islands’ culture and history. It is the official repository for collections of artifacts for American Samoa. Funded by the American Samoa Council on Arts, Culture and the Humanities, it is the venue used for numerous of the cultural resource activities in American Samoa.

== Location and history ==
The museum is located on the north side of Route 1 in Fagatogo, American Samoa, roughly opposite the main post office. The building in which it is located, formerly Navy Building 43 of Naval Station Tutuila, is itself historically significant as one of a few surviving buildings constructed by the United States Navy in 1917 with locally fashioned rusticated concrete blocks. The building served as the naval base's commissary until 1950, when it was turned over to civilian administration and converted to the island's main post office.

In 1923, Governor Edwin Taylor Pollock made the first proposal for a museum in American Samoa. This was included in his 1923 report to the Secretary of the Navy. However, work on the museum was not started before the arrival of First Lady Jean P. Haydon in 1969.

The post office moved to new facilities, and in 1971 the building was opened as the museum, which is named for the wife of then-governor John M. Haydon. It was dedicated by anthropologist Margaret Mead, who had returned to American Samoa to visit Ta'ū Island, where she wrote Coming of Age in Samoa.

The building was listed on the National Register of Historic Places in 1972. The museum was accredited by the American Association of Museums in 1978. It established close ties with the Bishop Museum of Hawai'i.

In 1999, Le´ala Elisara was appointed Director of the museum by Governor Tauese Sunia. She was reappointed in 2001.

== Name ==
It is named for the wife of Governor John Morse Haydon and former first lady of American Samoa, Jean P. Haydon of Seattle. She created a collection of Samoan artifacts inside the Government House on Mauga o Ali'i. She later moved this collection to its current location in 1972, when the museum was officially opened as the Jean Haydon Museum.

== Collections ==
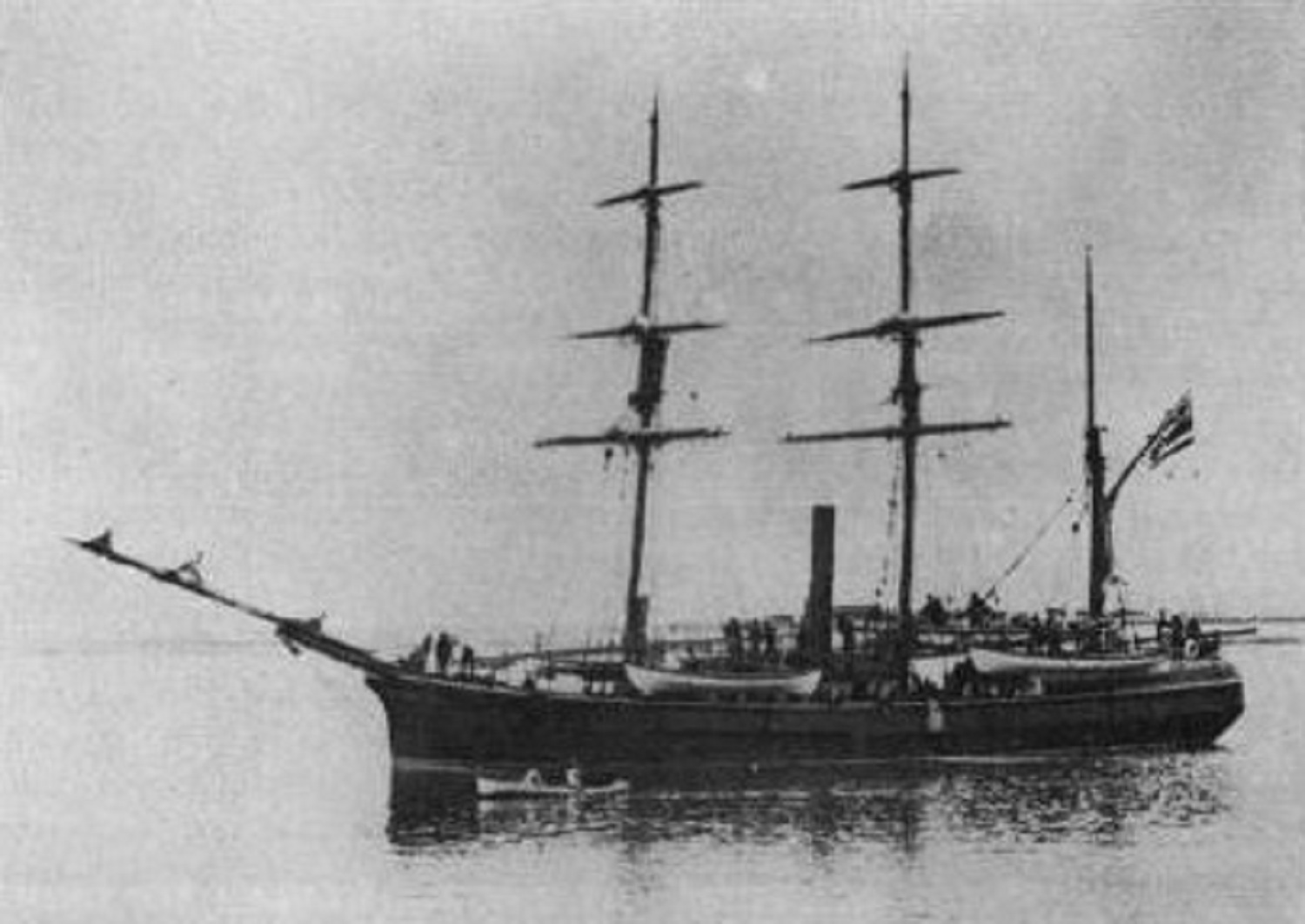
Cannons from HHMS Kaimiloa are on display at the museum.

It houses artifacts of early Samoa, including the va'a and 'alia (bonito and war canoes) that inspired the old name for the Samoan Islands, the Navigator Islands. It also houses coconut-shell necklaces, seashell and whales' teeth necklaces, seed and fruit jewelry, pigs' tusk armlets, fly-whisks, bamboo panpipes, stone tools, siapo cloth, and a variety of weapons. Besides items commonly used in early island life, it has a display of native pharmacopeia used by early Polynesians.

A portion of the museum is dedicated to the island's history with the Apollo missions. Apollo 10, 12, 13, 14, and 17 landed in the waters near Tutuila upon their return to Earth. Lunar rocks brought from the Moon on Apollo missions are at display at the museum. The museum is also home to an American Samoa flag, which was brought to the Moon by Apollo 11 in 1969. The flag and Moon rocks were given as a gift to American Samoa by President Richard Nixon following the return of the Apollo missions.

Among its prized exhibits is the Fala o Futa, an exquisite fine mat reputed to be the first of its kind in Samoa, donated by Senate President H.C. Salanoa S.P. Aumoeualogo. The museum also houses significant historical relics, including a cannon from the Kaimiloa, a 171-ton steamer that was the only warship in the fleet of King Kalākaua of Hawai'i. The Kaimiloa was sent to the Samoan Islands in 1887 as part of an ambitious effort by the Hawaiian king to establish a united Polynesian kingdom. These cannons, originally brought to Samoa as part of the Hawaiian Kingdom's display of power, played a key role in local defense when the people of Aunuʻu Island used them to repel an invading canoe fleet from Tutuila during the Samoan Civil War.

== See also ==
- National Register of Historic Places listings in American Samoa
