= Lauliʻi, American Samoa =

Village in American Samoa

Coordinates: 14°17′10″S 170°39′13″W

Lauliʻi is a village on the eastern side of Tutuila Island in American Samoa. It is located in Sua County. Entering the village of Lauliʻi, one has to climb a small hill where a lighthouse is located. The village's rugby club is named after the lighthouse — Moli ole Ava. It is one of the most successful and oldest clubs in the territory. Many well-known players have emerged from Lauliʻi, such as Vui Eli Tagaloa, the current coach, Ropeti TaulaTJ Aulava, and others. The village is divided into two sections: Lauliʻituai (Old Town) and Lauliʻifou (New Lauliʻi). As of Late 2020 there are 6 Christian Worship Churches in Lauliʻi. The Methodist, The Catholic, The London Missionary Society, Church, Assembly of God, The Church of Jesus Christ of Latter Day Saints, Saint John's Episcopal Church. Breakers Point Naval Guns, which is listed on the U.S. National Register of Historic Places is located at Tafananai near Lauliʻifou.

Lauliʻi had a population of 892 residents as of the 2010 U.S. census, down from 937 residents recorded in 2000.

== Etymology ==
The name of the village, Lauliʻi, is derived from the Samoan language and translates into English as “Small beach-plain".

== History ==
In 1901, a meeting was held at Lauliʻi in the honor of Benjamin Franklin Tilley, where Mrs. Tilley had the distinction of turning the first sod of the road planned to connect Lauliʻi with Fagaitua. The road received the name William McKinley Memorial Road.

On May 6, 2018, a new Church of Jesus Christ of Latter-day Saints congregation was established in Lauliʻi. Prior to its formation, LDS church members joined with fellow LDS members in Auto to worship. A new Assemblies of God (AOG) church was also dedicated at Lauli’i in 2018.

In 2019, the American Samoa Community College’s Agriculture, Community, and Natural Resources (ACNR) partnered with churches in Lauliʻi to clean up village streams.

== Notable people ==
- Mulitauaopele Pele Tamotu, senator and member of the American Samoa House of Representatives.
