= Samoa News =

American Newspaper

- Type: Newspaper
- Owner(s): Osini Faleatasi Inc.
- Editor: Rhonda Annesley
- Headquarters: Pago Pago, American Samoa
- Website: samoanews.com

The Samoa News is a newspaper published in Pago Pago, American Samoa.

In the 1960s, U.S. Marine Jake King from Arab, Alabama, became a part-owner of Samoa News, eventually becoming the sole owner by 1969. Despite orders from Governor John Morse Haydon to leave American Samoa, King remained and transformed Samoa News into a significant platform for public expression. He personally handled most of the reporting and editorial writing. King's wife, Rowena Avaoniua King, who was the first female newspaper publisher in American Samoa, co-operated and owned the newspaper with him. Rowena contributed a weekly column titled "Tailo," which was known for its bold exposés of governmental and community misconduct. Her writings led to a physical attack in Fagatogo by a family offended by her critiques. In 1983, the couple sold Samoa News and founded a new weekly publication, the Samoa Journal and Advertiser.

In 1981, Samoa News was the major newspaper distributed in both of the Samoas. In January 1985, Lewis Wolman became editor of Samoa News. The Samoa News Ltd. was established in 1986, with Fuga Teleso as the majority shareholder. Wolman purchased Teleso's shares on November 18, 1986, and became the publisher-editor for Samoa News. It began printing on a web press in December 1989, allowing for an increase in paper size. In January 1990, it became the first daily newspaper in American Samoa, printed at its new facilities in the downtown Pago Pago location in Fagatogo. Fuga Tolani Teleso was chairman of the board.

Samoa News was also the name for the first private newspaper in American Samoa, which was published from April 1963 – 1966.

A partial microfilm archive of the paper is kept by the University of Washington.
