= Aunuʻu, American Samoa =

Aunuʻu
- Island
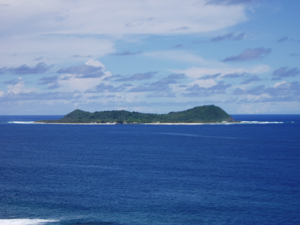

- Location within American Samoa
- Coordinates: 14°17′00″S 170°33′36″W
- Country: United States
- Territory: American Samoa
- County: Saʻole

Area
  - Total: 0.586 sq mi (1.517 km^{2})

Population (2020)
  - Total: 402

U.S. National Natural Landmark
- Designated: 1972

Aunuʻu is a small volcanic island off the southeastern shore of Tutuila in Saʻole County, American Samoa. It has a land area of 374.83 acres (0.59 sq mi; 1.52 km^{2}), and a 2010 census population of 436 persons. Politically, it is a part of the Eastern District, one of the two primary political divisions of American Samoa.

The island of Aunu’u is home to three villages: Le’auuliuli, Saluavatia, and Alofasau. Politically, the island is divided into two sections, Saole and Saleaaumua. The entirety of Saluavatia and half of Le’auuliuli are part of Saole, while the remaining half of Le’auuliuli, along with Alofasau, constitute Saleaaumua. The names of the villages are derived from the Samoan language. Le’auuliuli translates to "the black stalk," whereas Saluavatia means "a second Vatia."

Since the 1960s, the Aunuʻu people's main economic activity has been growing taro and producing faausi.

== Demographics ==
Year	Population
2020	402
2010	436
2000	476
1990	463
1980	414
1970	425
1960	436

== Geography ==
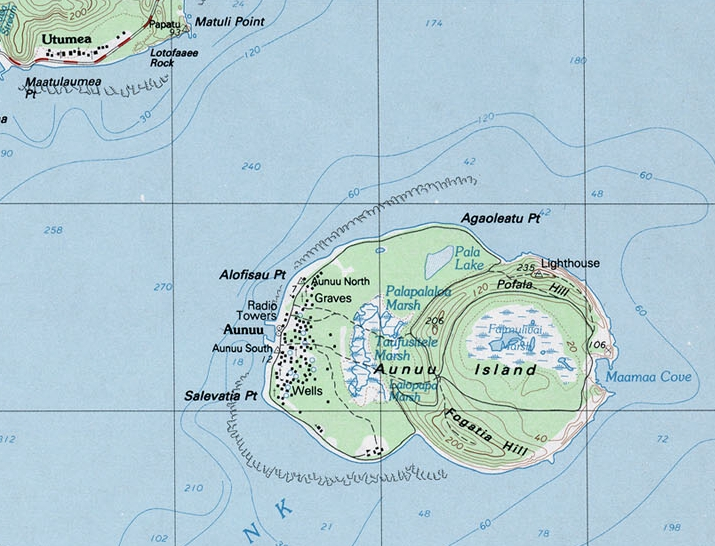

Aunuʻu is the only place in American Samoa where taro is cultivated in paddy fields, which occupies about 5 percent of the land. The remaining land is mostly wet and unsuitable for cultivation and is primarily covered by non-edible trees, bushes, shrubs and weeds. Agricultural runoff and erosion do not appear to threaten nearshore water quality, as these flow into Pala Lake and the wetlands areas (Pedersen 2000; Tuionoula 2010). Aunuʻu is said to produce the best taro in American Samoa (Best 1992).

=== Geology ===
Geologically, Aunuʻu Island is a volcanic cone (tuff cone). The island is less than 1 square mile (2.6 km^{2}) in area, and around half of that area is a cultivated plain on which Aunuʻu's villages are located. There are several beaches consisting of coral rubble and sand, and sea cliffs. The eastern half of Aunuʻu is rimmed by a geologically recent volcanic cone. The highest point on the crater rim is 310 feet (94 m) above sea level. Within the crater is the Faʻimulivai Marsh, which contains a freshwater pond. The crater is one of the few places in American Samoa where evidence of the more recent episodes of volcanism can be observed. The eruptions at Aunuʻu occurred at approximately the same time as the volcanism at Leʻala Shoreline in Taputimu, while the eruptions that formed Rainmaker Mountain, Matafao Peak, and the ridges of Vaiʻava Strait are much older. Aunuʻu Island has the only quicksand area in American Samoa, and also the territory's only lakes: Pala Lake is just north of the village, and Red Lake is inside the crater. Maʻamaʻa Cove is on the far eastern edge of the crater.

The volcanic island was formed by submarine volcanic activity, with a prominent tuff cone shaping its eastern half. This tuff cone is breached on the eastern margin, creating Maamaa Cove. The weathering of the tuff deposits has resulted in an impermeable layer at the base of the Aunuʻu Cone, allowing for the formation of a marsh and a lake within the cone. The Taufusitele Marsh occupies a portion of the coastal flat to the west of the cone. Beyond the marsh, the coastal flat is covered by significant deposits of calcareous sand and gravel, contributing to the island's unique geological and ecological landscape. Unlike Tutuila Island, Aunuʻu Island is home to a crater lake: Red Lake.

=== Lakes ===
Aunuʻu Island is home to the only freshwater lakes found in American Samoa. Aunu’u Crater Lake is among the most picturesque locations in American Samoa. Except for the outlet culvert, the area remains entirely untouched, supporting a vibrant marsh community and offering a unique habitat for fish and birds, including the rare Australian gray duck.

Faimulivai Marsh is the largest herbaceous freshwater marsh in American Samoa. This area provides essential habitat for the Australian gray duck and is recognized as one of the most picturesque locations in American Samoa. Except for the outlet culvert, the marsh remains entirely undisturbed.

Aunuʻu Crater contains the freshwater Faʻamulivai Marsh, the largest such wetland in American Samoa. It was formed from the drainage of the low-lying crater. It is part of a protected National Natural Landmark on Aunuʻu that was designated in 1972. The Pacific black duck was seen in the marsh in 1976, but it may now be extinct in the region; another significant local bird is the purple swamphen. This marsh is the only place in American Samoa where the Chinese water chestnut grows.

=== Climate change ===
In August 2019, rising sea levels from global warming inundated parts of Aunuʻu Island, leaving residents without electricity for several hours, sending 55-gallon drums from the island’s electricity generator drifting seaward, and covering the roads with debris.

== History ==
- 1500-900 BCE – The earliest human settlement of the Samoan archipelago is estimated to be around 2900–3500 years before the present (1500-900 BCE). This estimate is based on dating the ancient Lapita pottery shards that are found throughout the islands. The oldest shards found so far have been in Mulifanua and in Sasoaʻa, Falefa. The oldest archaeological evidence found on the islands of Polynesia, Samoa and Tonga all date from around that same period, suggesting that the first settlement occurred around the same time in the region as a whole to include Aunuʻu.
- 100-600AD – The first recorded settlers of the Marquesas were Polynesians who arrived from West Polynesia. Early attempts to carbon-date evidence from the site suggested they arrived before 100 AD, with other estimates proposing settlement from 600 AD, but several more recent independent studies suggest that they arrived more recently. In Te Henua ʻEnana (North Marquesan) and Te Fenua ʻEnata (South Marquesan) oral history – Aunuʻu is possibly mentioned in Moriori genealogy (23) as Raunuku.6 Kahotu, King of Aunuu, coincides with Kopotu, sixth King of Tonga. Tona-Nui appears in the title of the eighteenth King of Tonga—Havea-Tui Tonga-Nui-i-buibui (N.B.—Modern Tongan for Nui is Lahi). This is their oral history of where their original settlers came from.
- 1835 – A whaling vessel set out from Aunuʻu for the Manuʻa island and was lost at sea with all of its crew in the vicinity of Aunuʻu.
- 1863 – On January 24, 1863, the first Mormon Missionary, Kimo Belio and Samuela Manoa, of Hawai'i arrived in Aunuʻu and were accepted by the Aunuʻu Matai. They were the first to bring Mormonism to American Samoa. Aunuʻu is also where the LDS missionaries baptized the first church members in the Samoan Islands in 1866.
- 1877 – In this year war commenced in Tutuila. High Chief Mauga rebelled against the Government of Tutuila, the Taimua and Pule, where on December 8, 1877, Mauga escaped to Aunuʻu where he was defended by Aunuʻu island warriors from its natural fortress.
- 1887 – King David Kalākaua of Havaii sent his ship the Kaimiloa to Samoa to seek political alliance with another Polynesian nation. On June 15, 1887, the Kaimiloa arrived in Apia Harbor. With the German presence at Apia Harbor, the Kaimiloa trip was nothing more than a visit. Before returning to Hawaiʻi a few Hawaiʻians left the Kaimiloa to reside on the Samoan Island Aunuʻu and marrying Samoans. Pa Taua, on the west coast of the village of Aunuʻu, is the site of ruins that were once towers used to hold the four cannons from the Kaimiloa, a Hawaiian Kingdom steamer. The cannons were used by the people of Aunuʻu to repel a canoe fleet invasion and are now on display at the Jean P. Haydon Museum in Pago Pago.

Before 1900, Aunuʻu was not recognized as an independent political entity. Instead, Upolu considered it a subordinate district, and its involvement in broader Samoan governance was managed by the Fono of Falealili in Atua.

=== Kaimiloa ===
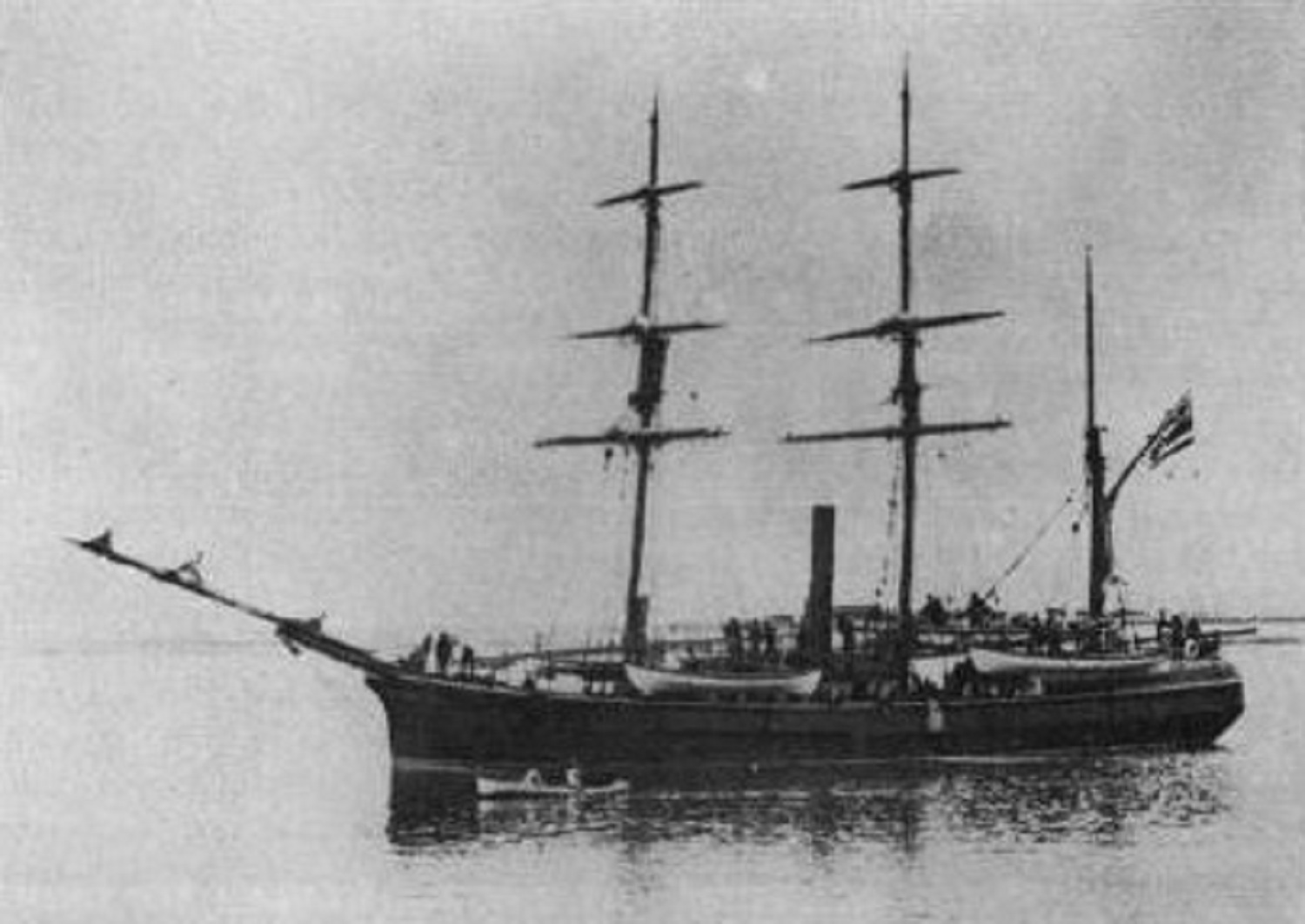
HHMS Kaimiloa.

In 1887, the Kaimiloa, a 171-short-ton (155 t) steamer commissioned by King Kalākaua of Hawai'i, stopped at Aunu'u Island during its mission to promote the creation of a Polynesian confederation. As part of its diplomatic and strategic outreach, the Kaimiloa aimed to foster alliances among Pacific islands and unify them against the encroachments of foreign empires like Germany, the United States, and Great Britain. During its stay on Aunu'u, two Hawaiian sailors, Aniani and Mahelona, deserted the ship, taking with them supplies, including rifles and cannons. These weapons, left behind from the Kaimiloa, would later play a pivotal role in fortifying Aunu'u and defending it from attackers.

At the time, Tutuila and neighboring islands were embroiled in political strife, with rival Samoan factions vying for dominance. Refugees fleeing violence on Tutuila sought asylum on Aunu'u, prompting the island's leaders and residents to prepare for possible attacks from pursuers. The two Hawaiian deserters, alongside a Hawaiian-descended storekeeper named Manoa, collaborated with the Samoan villagers to create a defense. They fortified the island with cannons and rifles and set up ambush points along the coral reef. In a decisive confrontation, the defenders of Aunu'u repelled an invasion force from Tutuila, using their fortified positions and firepower. This victory ensured that Aunu'u remained secure from external threats and marked the island as a key site of resistance during a turbulent period in Samoan history.

The successful defense, aided by contributions from the Hawaiian sailors and their weapons, fostered a lasting bond between the island's residents and the descendants of the Hawaiian contributors. Oral histories on Aunu'u continue to honor the memory of this alliance, and artifacts from the Kaimiloa, such as cannons, remain as tangible reminders of this shared history. One of the cannons from the Kaimiloa now resides at the Jean P. Haydon Museum in Pago Pago.

== Transportation ==
Aunuʻu has a few government cars, and a number of family owned/operated motorboats to shuttle people to and from its small boat harbor in Auasi. A lake, called "Vaisuakoko", or Blood Lake, is nestled in the island's sprawling crater. Hiking the island is difficult, as it is densely forested and full of thick bushes, with steep cliffs along the south coast. The island has a stretch of red quicksand at Pala Lake, fairly close to the village, and taro swamps behind the village. There is a cove, called "Maʻamaʻa Cove," on the east side of the island.

Boats providing ferry service to and from Aunuʻu may be hired at the boat dock at Auʻasi on Tutuila. The American Samoa Department of Port Administration maintains facilities at Auʻasi and Aunuʻu but does not track vessel arrival or departure data in either location (C. King 2010b). Aunuʻu is popular for hiking and school tours. The coral reef surrounding Aunuʻu is considered low use for recreational snorkeling (Spurgeon et al. 2004).

== Wildlife ==
Aunu'u Island is home to a large diversity of wildlife, including birds, mammals, reptiles, and amphibians. It is recognized as the premier location in American Samoa for observing the brown booby. The brown booby, though uncommon, nests between Agaoleatu Point and Ma’ama’a Cove. The white-tailed tropicbird is abundant, as are the crimson-crowned fruit dove and the wattled honeyeater. Other notable species include the Polynesian starling and the Pacific pigeon. Wetland birds include the very common banded rail and the less frequent purple swamphen. The Australian gray duck is observed at Pala Lake and Faimulivai Marsh Lake. At Pala Mud Lake, the golden plover, ruddy turnstone, and bar-tailed godwit are present, though the latter two are relatively rare.

Seabirds are well-represented, with gray-backed terns on the northeast cliffs, blue-gray noddies near Pofala Hill and Fogatia Hill, and brown noddies from Agaoleata Point to Fogatia Hill. White terns nest on rock cliffs along the coast. The reef heron is found on the island's reefs. Occasional sightings include the long-tailed cuckoo and eastern barn owl near Aunu'u Village. The collared kingfisher is another resident species.

The flying fox roosts in large colonies on Fogatia Hill and forages island-wide. The sheath-tailed bat utilizes caves for shelter. Introduced mammals include the roof rat and Polynesian rat, with historical reports of wild boar. Reptiles are abundant, with the azure-tailed skink, black skink, and moth skink being especially common. Amphibians include the marine toad, which is concentrated near Taufusitete Marsh. The black turtle is a rare visitor, occasionally laying eggs on the sandy beaches around Agaoleatu Point.

Aunuʻu has a population of around fifty gray ducks (anas superciliosa), locally known as toloa. Pairs of these birds have also been sighted in Futiga, Nuʻuuli, Alao, and Leone, however, they may not be based in those villages; they may belong to the population that lives on Aunuʻu.

== Notable people ==
- Faalupega o Aunuu Afio Lupega (Lemafa ma Lutali), Susu le Ma’opu (Saole), Susu le Saʻo (Sagale), Susu le Tama-a-aiga (Fonoti), Mamalu maia oulua fofoga o le Saʻole (Taufi ma Fuiava), ma upu ia Saole ma Saleaumua faapea le lauti na laulelei.
- Aifili Paulo Lauvao (December 24, 1919 – August 1, 2002), was twice governor of American Samoa (1985–1989, 1993–1997). The founder of the U.S. territory's Democratic Party, he had a long career in the legislature and the judiciary in American Samoa. Governor Lutali was a preservationist who wanted to preserve large areas of the territory's nature. Lutali also worked to preserve American Samoa's ancient sites and historical buildings. He revitalized the Historic Preservation Office.
- Tiaina Baul "Junior" Seau Jr. (/ˈseɪ.aʊ/; SAY-ow; January 19, 1969 – May 2, 2012) was an American professional football player who was a linebacker in the National Football League (NFL). Known for his passionate play, he was a nine-time All-Pro, 12-time Pro Bowl selection, and named to the NFL 1990s All-Decade Team. He was elected posthumously to the Pro Football Hall of Fame in 2015.

== See also ==
- List of National Natural Landmarks in American Samoa
