= ʻAuʻasi, American Samoa =

ʻAuʻasi
- Village
- Location within American Samoa
- Coordinates: 14°16′36″S 170°34′28″W
- Country: United States
- Territory: American Samoa

Area
  - Total: 0.26 sq mi (0.67 km^{2})

Population (2020)
  - Total: 88
  - Density: 340/sq mi (130/km^{2})

ʻAuʻasi is a village in the east of Tutuila Island, American Samoa. One of the island's more populous villages, it is located on the south coast, close to the eastern tip of the island and to the smaller offshore island of Aunuʻu. It is located in Saʻole County.

Above the village is a waterfall known as ʻAuʻasi Falls. This can be visited by following the stream in ʻAuʻasi for about 30 minutes. It is particularly impressive after heavy rain.

Ferries for Aunu'u Island leave from the dock at ʻAuʻasi. ʻAuʻasi is located roughly one mile from Aunu'u Island and is therefore the closest land area to Aunu'u on Tutuila Island.

== Geography ==
ʻAuʻasi is a village situated on the southeastern coast of Tutuila Island, in Saʻole County in the Eastern District. Approximately 15 road miles from Pago Pago Harbor, Auasi lies in a shallow bay nestled between Taugamalama Point and Maatu'aume Point. The village is 1.2 miles from Aunu'u Island, serving as the traditional landing site for its residents. ʻAuʻasi covers a relatively flat area of around 10 acres, with land elevations between 8 and 12 feet above sea level. The terrain consists of coastal terraces formed by stream erosion and sediment deposits, underlain by silt to boulder-sized sediments derived from the offshore reef. Coral limestone sand and gravel are present along the shoreline, gradually transitioning into steep cliffs below the beach.

As the primary gateway for Aunuʻu Island, ʻAuʻasi plays a pivotal role in daily commutes and logistics. Residents of Aunuʻu rely on longboats and small motorboats to travel between the island and ʻAuʻasi for education, work, and access to markets in Pago Pago. The village supports agricultural activities, with crops like taro, breadfruit, and citrus transported to the markets in Pago Pago.

== Demographics ==
Year	Population
2020	88
2010	113
2000	125
1990	122
1980	117
1970	74
1960	43
