= Fagaʻitua Bay =

Bay in American Samoa

Coordinates: 14°16′30″S 170°37′00″W

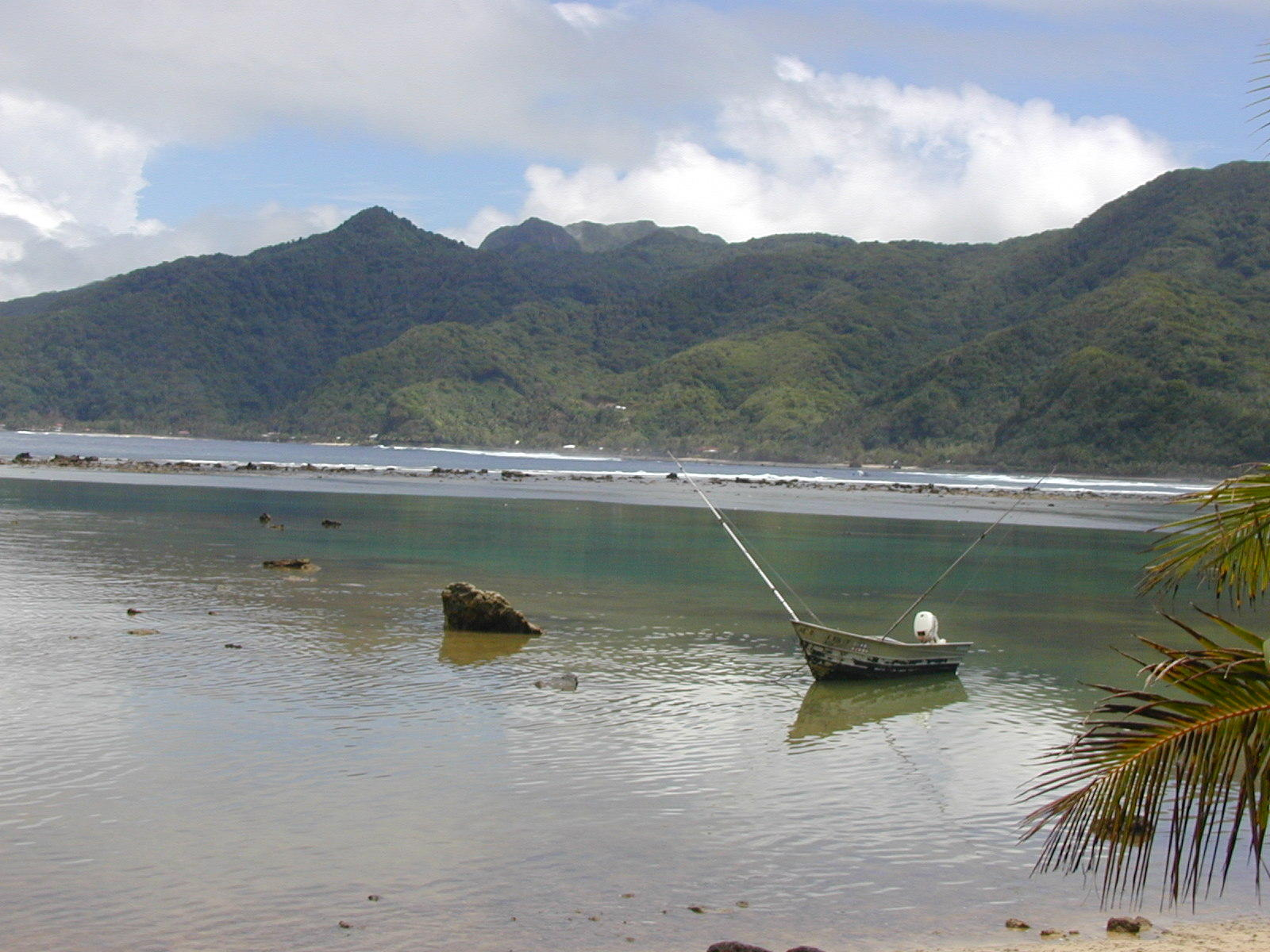
Fagaitua bay

Faga'itua Bay is a large indentation in the eastern south coast of Tutuila in American Samoa. Many of the island's villages are located on the shore of the bay, the largest of which is Faga'itua. Other villages are Auto, Amaua, Utusia, Pagai, and Alofau.
