= Suʻa County =

County of Eastern District, American Samoa

Coordinates: 14°17′10″S 170°39′13″W

Suʻa County (itu malo Suʻa) is a county in the Eastern District in American Samoa. Su'a County contains the villages of Afono, Fagaitua, Falefa (including the settlements of Alega, Amaua, Auto, Avai'o and a portion of the settlement of Pagai), Lauli'i, Masefau, Masausi and Sailele. The county had a population of 3,323 as of the 2010 U.S. Census. According to the Constitution of American Samoa, Sua County is represented by two senatorial seats in the American Samoa Senate.

Fagaʻitua is the principal place of Suʻa County.

== History ==
In 1959, Mulitauaopele “Pele” Tamotu of Lauliʻi was elected to the American Samoa Senate representing Suʻa County, serving until his death in 1986. He played a prominent role in major political developments of the 20th century, including the passage of the first Constitution of American Samoa in 1960, the transition of the Legislature to full-time status, and the movement for an elected governor, which culminated in 1977.

== Demographics ==
Historical population
Year	Pop.	±%
1912	469	—
1920	633	+35.0%
1930	622	−1.7%
1940	881	+41.6%
1950	1,325	+50.4%
1960	1,500	+13.2%
1970	2,336	+55.7%
1980	2,455	+5.1%
1990	3,116	+26.9%
2000	3,417	+9.7%
2010	3,323	−2.8%
2020	2,415	−27.3%
U.S. Decennial Census

Su'a County was first recorded beginning with the 1912 special census. Regular decennial censuses were taken beginning in 1920.

== Villages ==
- Āfono
- Fagaitua
- Falefa (including Ālega, Amaua, Auto, Avai'o and a portion of Pagai)
- Lauli'i
- Masefau
- Masausi
- Sa'ilele

== Points of interest ==
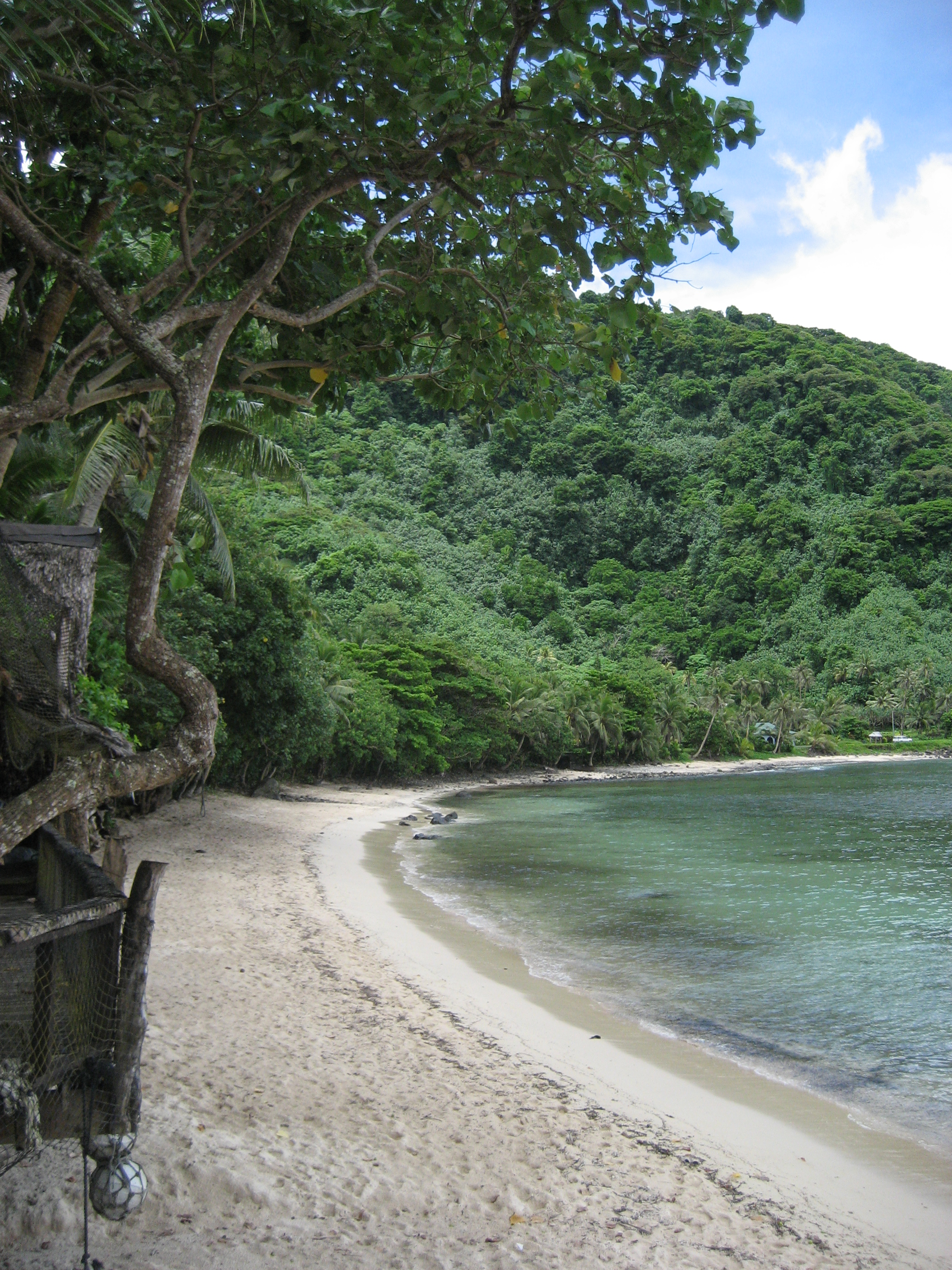
Beach near Tisa's Barefoot Bar

- Ālega Beach
- Faga'itua Bay
- Lions Head (Faalogologotala Rock)
- National Park of American Samoa
- Pyramid Rock (Fatuto'aga Rock)
- Rainmaker Mountain
- Sa'ilele Beach
- Tisa's Barefoot Bar
- Two Dollar Beach
