= National Register of Historic Places listings in American Samoa =

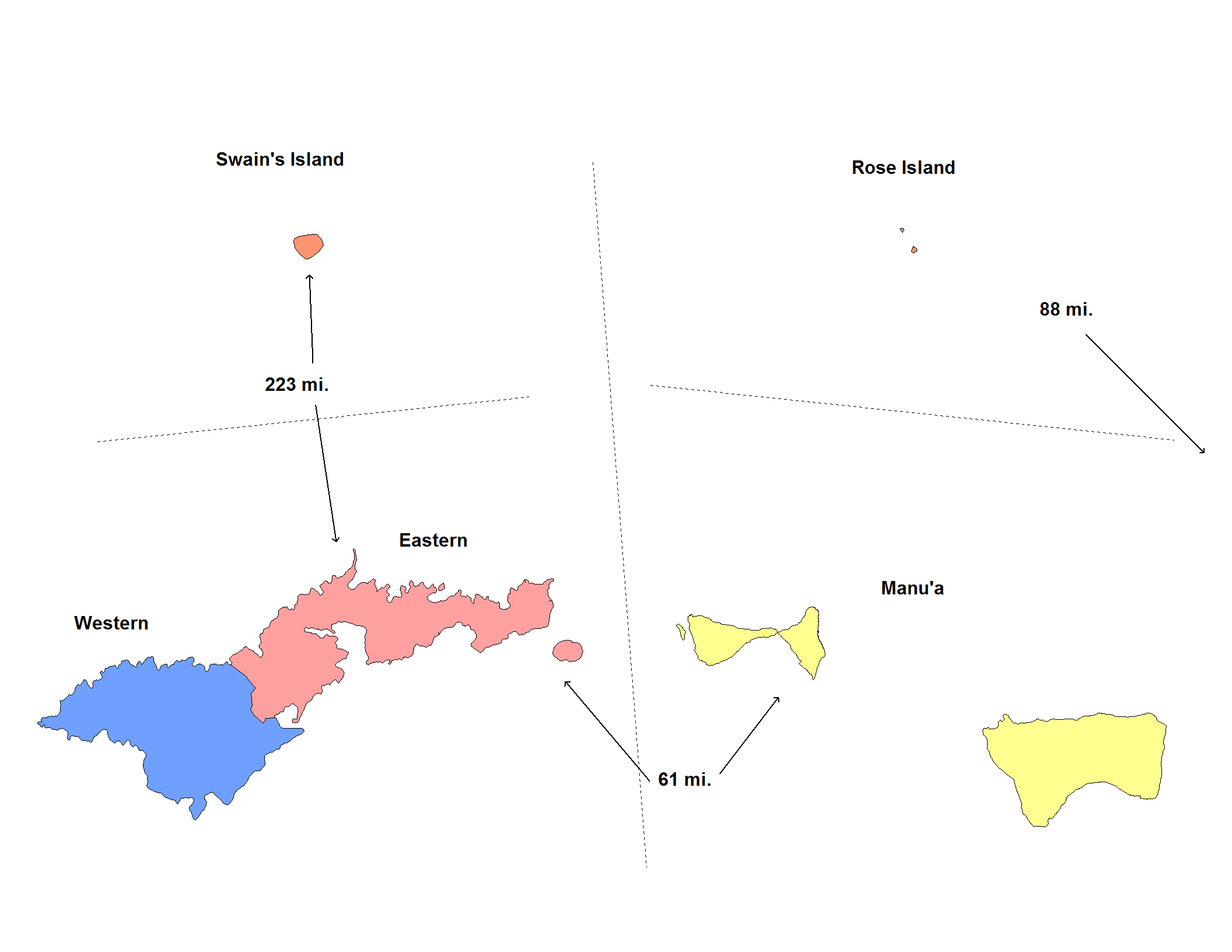
American Samoa districts (clickable)

This is a list of the buildings, sites, districts, and objects listed on the National Register of Historic Places in American Samoa. There are currently 31 listed sites spread across the three districts of American Samoa. There are no sites listed on the unorganized atoll of Swains Island.

This National Park Service list is complete through NPS recent listings posted October 2, 2026.

== Numbers of listings ==
The following are approximate tallies of current listings in American Samoa on the National Register of Historic Places. These counts are based on entries in the National Register Information Database as of April 24, 2008 and new weekly listings posted since then on the National Register of Historic Places web site. There are frequent additions to the listings and occasional delistings and the counts here are not official. Also, the counts in this table exclude boundary increase and decrease listings which modify the area covered by an existing property or district and which carry a separate National Register reference number.

	District	# of Sites
1	Eastern	15
2	Manu'a	2
3	Rose Atoll	1
4	Swains Island	0
5	Western	13
Total:		31

== Eastern ==
	Name on the Register	Image	Date listed	Location	Village	Description
1	Blunts Point Naval Guns	Blunts Point Naval Guns	April 26, 1973 (#73002128)	Matautu Ridge; 14°17′08″S 170°40′36″W	Pago Pago	
2	Breakers Point Naval Guns	Breakers Point Naval Guns	October 18, 1999 (#99001231)	Breakers Point; 14°17′11″S 170°39′30″W	Lauli'i	
3	Courthouse of American Samoa	Courthouse of American Samoa	February 12, 1974 (#74002180)	Near Pago Pago Harbor; 14°16′41″S 170°41′26″W	Fagatogo	
4	Government House	Government House	March 16, 1972 (#72001443)	Togotogo Ridge; 14°16′38″S 170°40′59″W	Pago Pago	
5	Michael J. Kirwan Educational Television Center	Michael J. Kirwan Educational Television Center	October 23, 2009 (#09000842)	American Samoa Highway 118, north side of Utulei; 14°16′41″S 170°40′59″W	Utulei	
6	Lau'agae Ridge Quarry	Lau'agae Ridge Quarry	March 30, 2000 (#99001227)	Address restricted	Tula	
7	Governor H. Rex Lee Auditorium		November 12, 2010 (#10000888)	American Samoa Highway 001, William McKinley Memorial Highway; 14°16′44″S 170°40′59″W	Utulei	
8	Masefau Defensive Fortifications		November 14, 2012 (#12000919)	Masefau Beach; 14°15′26″S 170°37′48″W	Masefau	
9	Navy Building 38		March 16, 1972 (#72001441)	Pago Pago Harbor; 14°16′41″S 170°41′19″W	Fagatogo	
10	Navy Building 43	Navy Building 43	March 16, 1972 (#72001442)	Pago Pago Harbor; 14°16′40″S 170°41′16″W	Fagatogo	Now the Jean P. Haydon Museum
11	Old Vatia		November 2, 2006 (#06000956)	Above Vatia southwest of American Samoa Highway 015; 14°15′13″S 170°41′08″W	Vatia	
12	Satala Cemetery		October 19, 2006 (#05001110)	American Samoa Highway 001, west of Satala; 14°16′14″S 170°41′42″W	Lalopua	
13	Sadie Thompson Building	Sadie Thompson Building	July 2, 2003 (#03000582)	Along main road 14°16′35″S 170°41′35″W	Fagatogo	
14	Tulauta Village	Tulauta Village	June 2, 1997 (#87001980)	Address restricted	Tula	
15	U.S. Naval Station Tutuila Historic District	U.S. Naval Station Tutuila Historic District	June 20, 1990 (#90000854)	South and west sides of Pago Pago Harbor; 14°16′44″S 170°41′09″W	Fagatogo and Utulei	

== Manu'a ==
	Name on the Register	Image	Date listed	Location	Village	Description
1	Faga Village Site	Faga Village Site	November 23, 2003 (#99001228)	Address restricted	Fitiuta	
2	Tui Manu'a Graves Monument		November 19, 2015 (#15000812)	Northwest of the junction of Ta'u Village and Ta'u Island Roads; 14°13′41″S 169°30′58″W	Ta'u	

== Rose Atoll ==
	Name on the Register	Image	Date listed	Location	Village	Description
1	Rose Island Concrete Monument	Rose Island Concrete Monument	December 18, 2013 (#13000920)	Approximately 160 feet (49 m) east of atoll lagoon 14°32′50″S 168°08′43″W	Rose Atoll	Concrete marker placed in 1920 during visit to atoll by Governor Terhune.

== Western ==
	Name on the Register	Image	Date listed	Location	Village	Description
1	A'a Village (AS-34-33)	A'a Village (AS-34-33)	November 19, 1987 (#87001956)	Address restricted	Tapua'ina	
2	Aasu	Aasu	April 13, 1972 (#72001444)	Adjacent to Massacre Bay; 14°17′33″S 170°45′37″W	Aasu	An armed confrontation between Samoans and French explorers from Lapérouse's expedition on this site in 1787 led to the deaths of 12 Frenchmen. News of the incident gave Samoans a reputation for ferocity among Europeans and deterred foreign intervention in Samoa for about a century. The French government placed a memorial at the site in 1883.
3	Afao Beach Site		November 14, 2012 (#12000916)	Afao Beach; 14°19′56″S 170°48′01″W	Afao	
4	Atauloma Girls School	Atauloma Girls School	March 16, 1972 (#72001445)	West edge of Afao; 14°19′48″S 170°48′06″W	Afao	The London Missionary Society opened this parochial school in 1900 as the second secondary school on Tutuila, and the first to admit girls. It prepared girls primarily to be pastors' wives, and after 1913 provided graduates to the nursing school at the naval station at Pago Pago.
5	Fagalele Boys School	Fagalele Boys School	March 16, 1972 (#72001446)	South of Leone; 14°20′31″S 170°47′10″W	Leone	This 19th-century residential parochial school was built by the London Missionary Society for the primary purpose of educating future pastors, possibly as early as 1850. It was the first secondary school in what is now American Samoa, and it may be the oldest surviving building on Tutuila.
6	Fagatele Bay Site	Fagatele Bay Site	June 2, 1997 (#87001958)	Address restricted	Futiga	
7	Malaeola Olo	Malaeola Olo	January 5, 2016 (#15000949)	Address restricted	Malaeola Itu'au	
8	Maloata Village	Maloata Village	June 12, 1997 (#87001955)	Address restricted	Tapua'ina	
9	Poloa Defensive Fortifications		November 14, 2012 (#12000917)	Poloa Beach; 14°18′59″S 170°50′03″W	Poloa	Consisting of three pillboxes along the beach, these fortifications were built by American Marines as part of a system of defenses against a feared Japanese amphibious invasion of Samoa during the early part of World War II.
10	Site AS-31-72	Site AS-31-72	June 2, 1997 (#97000431)	Address restricted	Faleniu	
11	Tataga-Matau Fortified Quarry Complex (AS-34-10)	Tataga-Matau Fortified Quarry Complex (AS-34-10)	November 19, 1987 (#87001957)	Address restricted	Leone	
12	Tupapa Site	Tupapa Site	October 30, 2009 (#09000852)	Address restricted	A'asufou	
13	Turtle and Shark		November 19, 2014 (#14000925)	2506 Turtle and Shark Road; 14°21′26″S 170°44′08″W	Vaitogi	Site associated with an important event recounted in Samoan oral history.

== See also ==
- List of United States National Historic Landmarks in United States commonwealths and territories, associated states, and foreign states
- List of National Natural Landmarks in American Samoa
