= Tui Manuʻa Graves Monument =

Grave site in American Samoa

- U.S. National Register of Historic Places
- Location within American Samoa
- Location: Northwest of the junction of Taʻū Village and Taʻū Island Roads Taʻū, Manuʻa, American Samoa
- Coordinates: 14°13′41″S 169°30′58″W
- Area: less than one acre
- Built: 1895
- NRHP reference No.: 15000812
- Added to NRHP: November 19, 2015

The Tui Manuʻa Graves Monument is a funerary marker and grave site on the island Taʻū, the largest island of the Manuʻa group in American Samoa. It is located northwest of the junction of Taʻū Village and Taʻū Island Roads on the west side of the island. It consists of a stone platform, about 3 feet (0.91 m) in height, that is roughly rectangular in shape with a projection at one end. Three graves are marked by square sections of smoothed stones, while a fourth is marked by a marble column. A possible fifth grave, unmarked, is in the projection. It is the burial site of several (four or five) tuʻi, or kings, of Manuʻa, including Tui Manuʻa Matelita and Tui Manuʻa Elisala, the Samoan leader whose signature granted the United States hegemony over the islands.

The monument was listed on the National Register of Historic Places in 2015.

== See also ==
- Tui Manuʻa
- National Register of Historic Places listings in American Samoa
