= Satala (disambiguation) =

Satala (Old Armenian: Սատաղ Satał, Ancient Greek: Σάταλα), is a place Located in Turkey.

Satala may also refer to:

- Satala Aphrodite, a statue.
- Satala in Lydia, a Roman-era city.
- Satala Cemetery, is a place located on the north side of Pago Pago Harbor on the island of Tutuila.
