= Governor Bryan =

Governor Bryan may refer to:

- Albert Bryan (politician) (born 1968), 9th Governor of the United States Virgin Islands
- Charles W. Bryan (1867–1945), 20th and 23rd Governor of Nebraska
- George Bryan (1731–1791), 2nd President of Pennsylvania
- Henry Francis Bryan (1865–1944), 17th Governor of American Samoa
- Richard Bryan (born 1937), 25th Governor of Nevada

== See also ==
- Governor Bryant (disambiguation)
