= Nuusetoga Island =

Island in American Samoa

Coordinates: 14°14′59″S 170°37′24″W

Nuusetoga Island is situated along the northern coast of Tutuila Island in American Sāmoa. It forms the western entrance to Masefau Bay, approximately 0.5 miles northeast of the village of Masefau. Historically, the island has also been referred to as Bartlett Islet or Bartlett Island. Nuusetoga Island is a small landform approximately 0.3 miles long. It is connected to the west point of Masefau Bay by a coral reef. The island plays a significant role in narrowing the anchorage in the bay due to the surrounding reefs. The coral reefs around the island create a natural barrier, leaving only a small channel available for boat access to the beach.

== Geological significance ==
Nuusetoga Island lies near the Masefau Dike Complex, a geological structure on Tutuila Island composed of hundreds of basaltic dikes. These dikes range in width from a few centimeters to 2 meters and are among the oldest exposed rocks in the area. The rocks are primarily vesicular and amygdaloidal basalt. The geological formations of the Masefau Dike Complex suggest that the area is part of a volcanic rift zone. Studies indicate the dikes may represent the eroded caldera wall of an ancient volcano, possibly predating the Pago Volcano. The north side of the Masefau Dike Complex, exposed near Afono Bay, has been a site of significant geological interest. The cliffs opposite Nuusetoga Island may represent an eroded fault scarp or sea cliff. Additionally, the island serves as an important vantage point for ecological surveys, such as observing the movement of fruit bats between the island and mainland Tutuila.
