= Masefau Defensive Fortifications =

- U.S. National Register of Historic Places
- Location within American Samoa
- Nearest city: Masefau, American Samoa
- Coordinates: 14°15′15″S 170°37′52″W
- Area: Lucile
- Built: 1940
- Built by: US Navy
- NRHP reference No.: 12000919
- Added to NRHP: November 14, 2012

The Masefau Defensive Fortifications consist of a pair of concrete pillboxes on the shores of Masefau Bay on the island of Tutuila in the United States territory of American Samoa. These octagonal structures differ from others found in western Tutuila in that they have no separate interior space for the storage of ammunition. The structures were exposed by a typhoon in 2009.

The site was listed on the National Register of Historic Places in 2012.

== See also ==
- National Register of Historic Places listings in American Samoa
