= Masefau, American Samoa =

Village in American Samoa

Masefau is a village located in the Eastern District of American Samoa, near the villages of Utuloa and Masausi. It is situated along Masefau Bay, on the northeast side of Tutuila Island.

== History ==
The pillboxes associated with the Masefau Defensive Fortifications, a World War II-era monument, were listed on the U.S. National Register of Historic Places in 2012.

== Geography ==
Masefau Bay is located approximately 1.5 miles east of Afono Bay on Tutuila Island. The bay is sheltered on its northwest side by Nuusetoga Island (also known as Bartlett Island), which is connected to the west point of the bay by a reef. A rock protruding above water is situated near Tiapea Point, the eastern boundary of the bay. The inner part of Masefau Bay is fringed by a coral reef, which limits the anchorage area and leaves only a narrow channel for small boats to access the beach. The village of Masefau is situated on the western side of the bay.

=== Geology ===
The Masefau Dike Complex is a geological feature comprising hundreds of basaltic dikes, ranging from a few centimeters to 2 meters in width. These dikes, which are vesicular, platy, or amygdaloidal, strike N70°E and dip slightly southward. They are among the oldest exposed rocks in the region, believed to be remnants of a volcanic rift zone. The complex is exposed at a cliff near Nuusetoga Island (formerly Bartlett Island), which may represent an eroded fault scarp or sea cliff. The cliff is topped with 3–23 meters of vitric basaltic pumice and cinders, overlaid by aa basalt flows. Geologist Harold Stearns proposed that this area may be part of an eroded caldera wall of an ancient volcano or an early rift zone horst block of the Pago Volcano. Formed at depths of 92–610 meters beneath a volcanic rift zone, the dike complex is intersected by thin, faulted basaltic lava flows dipping 10–20° NW. Repeated dike intrusions likely fractured the rocks, causing brecciated material to settle into the underlying magma chamber. Over time, erosion has removed over 300 meters of overlying lava.

== Flora ==
Mangrove forests are found at four locations on Tutuila Island in American Samoa: Masefau, ʻAoa, Nuʻuuli, and Leone. The mangrove forest at Masefau is particularly notable for its unique setting. It is nearly enclosed by a sandy beach ridge and extends approximately 200 meters inland. Although its landform resembles that of coastal marshes, it remains connected to the sea through a stream channel, allowing the tidal inundation essential for the mangrove ecosystem's survival. There is speculation that the beach ridge, on which the village of Masefau is situated, may be partially man-made.

== Fauna ==
Small numbers of the Black Turtle (Chelonia agassizii) have been recorded within Masefau Bay.
