= Governor Bryant =

Governor Bryant may refer to:

- C. Farris Bryant (1914–2002), 34th Governor of Florida
- Phil Bryant (born 1954), 64th Governor of Mississippi

== See also ==
- Governor Bryan (disambiguation)
