= Tui Manuʻa Elisala =

Tui Manu'a

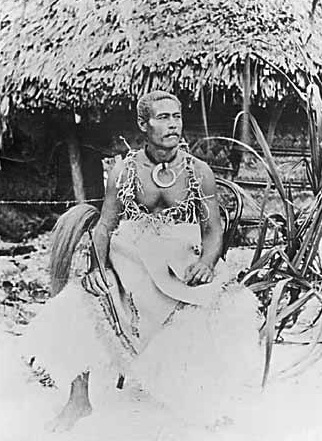
Tuimanuʻa Elisala

Tui Manuʻa Elisara (died 2 July 1909) was the last Tui Manu'a titleholder in Manu'a, which is now part of the U.S. Territory of American Samoa. Elisala was the son of Tui Manuʻa Alalamua whose genealogy descended from the Sa Tagaloa.

== Biography ==
Tui Manu'a Elisara was born on the island of Ta'u as the second son of Tui Manu'a Alaalamua and Sofe, a daughter of Matiu of Ta'u island. Tui Manu'a Alalamua (of one of the female branches of the larger Anoalo clan called the Avaloa clan in the Tui Manu'a family) was the successor of Tui Manu'a Tauveve, also from the Falesoā clan. Shortly after the death of Tui Manu'a Alalamua a vigorous debate ensued among potential heirs.

From the three main branches of the Tui Manu'a family, three candidates emerged from each clan as each endorsed by their own branches of the Tui Manu'a family and their political allies: Alaalamua's own son, Elisara (from the Avaloa clan) was named as an obvious contender although Elisara himself refused the title in lieu of his religious calling. The other two claimants were Taofi (Also from the female branch of the larger Anoalo clan called the Falesoā clan of the Tui Manu'a family) and a young woman named Matelita (a descendant of Tui Manu'a Taliutafa Tupolo, son of Tui Manu'a Moaatoa of the Lalopu'a clan of the larger Anoalo clan).

With Elisara temporarily out of the succession, Taofi remained as one of the lesser direct heir and his party named him Tui Manu'a. Matelita's party, however, was able to amass even more support for her campaign (mainly through her male-side lineage of the Lalopu'a clan of the Tui Manu'a family and Eastern and Western Samoan relatives of her half-caste father Arthur Stephen "Pa'u" Young); Makerita capitulated to her sovereignty and she held the title until her death in 1895 which is shrouded in suspicion. After Tui Manuʻa Makeritas death, the Faletolu requested that Elisara Alaalamua take the title, in 1899 chiefly assembly of the Faletolu and Anoalo appointed the title to one of the female branches the Avaloa clan from Alaalamua's line by persuading Elisara to take the throne.

Tui Manu’a Elisara Alalamua attended the London Missionary Society seminary in Malua on 'Upolu island and returned to his native village where he served as the Congregationalist minister of Fitiuta. When the Faletolu (chiefly assembly) of Ta'u approached Elisara about taking the Tui Manu'a throne the request was initially denied on the grounds of his ministry. However, when the Berlin Act placed the Manu'a islands under the protection of the United States, he was petitioned zealously by the people of Manu'a. He accepted the leadership role and was bestowed the paramount title of Tui Manu'a on the island of Ta'u on 25 October 1899.

The Manu'a islands were grouped with Tutuila and Aunu'u as the United States possession now called American Samoa. The presidency of the United States, and the military authorities of the US Navy, supplanted the native administrative role of the Tui Manu'a, through the arrests of his talking chiefs and eventually two trials of the Tui Manu'a, one off the coast of Ta'u, called the "Trial of the Ipu". On 6 July 1904 Tui Manu'a Elisara officially ceded the islands of Manu'a to the United States through the signing of the Treaty of Cession of Manu'a. He was relegated the office of Governor of Manu'a for the term of life and the understanding that the Tui Manu'a title would follow him to the grave. He died on 1 April 1909.

After a fifteen-year break, the office was revived in 1924 when Chris Taliutafa Young, a member of the Male line of the Anoalo clan of Lalopu'a from the Tui Manu'a family and the brother of Tui Manu'a Matelita who reigned between 1890 and 1895, was named Tui Manu'a by the general assembly of the Faletolu and Anoalo. American officials were worried that the Manu'ans were restoring a "king" who would cause trouble for the administration. Governor Edward Stanley Kellogg opposed the bestowal and had the new Tui Manu'a brought to Tutuila where he was prevented from exercising the powers of his office. The Governor did not recognized the title on the basis that a monarchy was incompatible within the framework of the Constitution of the United States, and the previous Tui Manu'a had pledged to be the last person to hold the title.

== Bibliography ==
- Isaia, Malopaʻupo (1999). Coming of Age in American Anthropology: Margaret Mead and Paradise. Boca Raton, Florida: Universal-Publishers. ISBN 9781581128451.
- McMullin, Dan Taulapapa. 2005. "The Passive Resistance of Samoans to US and Other Colonialisms", article in "Sovereignty Matters" , University of Nebraska Press.
- Office of the Governor. 2004. Manu'a ma Amerika. A brief historical documentary. Manu'a Centennial. 16 July 1904. 16 July 2004. Office of the Governor, American Samoa Government. 20 p.
- Young, Stephen L. "Get The Facts Straight About Tui Manu'a". Samoa News. Archived from the original on 7 June 2011.
- Linnekin, Hunt, Lang & McCormick (University of Hawaii Pacific Islands Cooperative Botanic Studies Institute)

Preceded by Matelita	Tui Manu'a; 1899–1909	Succeeded by Chris Young
