= Breakers Point Naval Guns =

- U.S. National Register of Historic Places
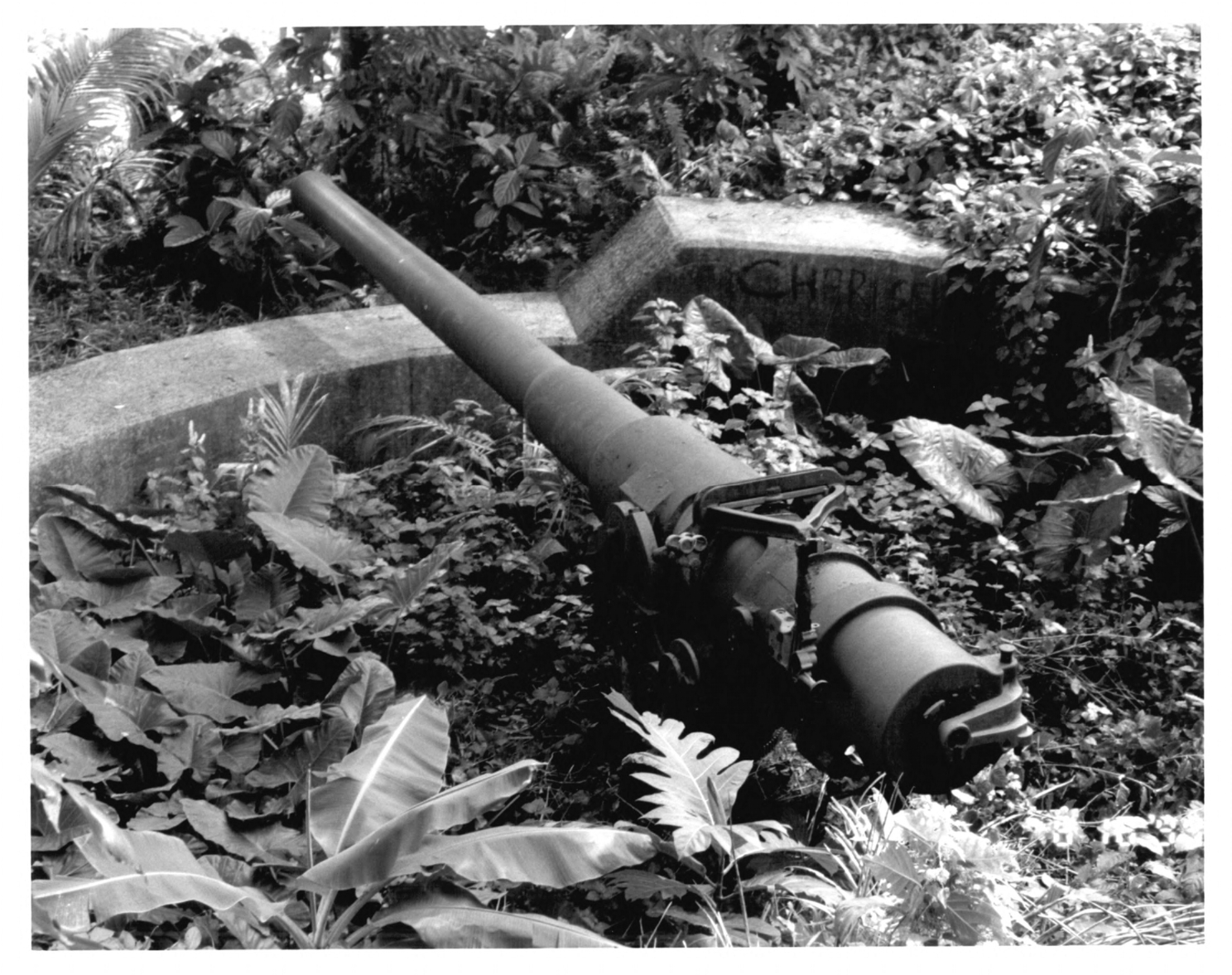
- Northern gun in 1999

- Location within American Samoa
- Nearest city: Tafananai, Lauli'i, American Samoa
- Coordinates: 14°17′11″S 170°39′30″W
- Area: less than 1-acre (4,000 m^{2})
- Built: 1940
- Built by: US Navy; Utah Construction Co.
- Architectural style: Mark 8 Model 2 naval rifles
- NRHP reference No.: 99001231
- Added to NRHP: October 18, 1999

The Breakers Point Naval Guns are a historic World War II-era defensive fortification on the island of Tutuila in American Samoa. It consists of two 6-inch (150 mm) Mark 8 Model 2 naval guns, mounted on circular concrete platforms about 200-foot (61 m) above sea level at the end of Papatele Ridge, which flanks the east side of Pago Pago Harbor. The guns, manufactured in 1907, were emplaced in 1941 amid fears of a Japanese invasion of the island, and were left in situ (albeit disabled) after invasion fears subsided. They were brought to the site by an innovative railway system that used locally crafted rails fashioned out of ifil wood when steel rails were not available. The guns are located on private family-owned land, but may be hiked to with permission.

The site was listed on the National Register of Historic Places in 1999.

== History ==
In October 1941, six-inch Naval guns arrived in Pago Pago in crates. There were four unwieldy cannons of this caliber, each measuring over 20 feet (6.1 m) long and weighing ten tons. The guns had to somehow be lifted into the elevated newly made concrete positions on Breakers and Blunts Points, about 500 feet (150 m) above ground level. The only available routes went through the jungle and up 70-degree, muddy slopes. There were no trails, roads nor paths leading to these four positions on each side of the Pago Pago Harbor. It was later determined that a tramway was needed in order to move the guns up the hills. The contractors immediately sent a request to Alameda, California for steel rails, hoisting gear, and cables.

== See also ==
- Blunts Point Battery, located across the harbor
- National Register of Historic Places listings in American Samoa
