= Maloata Village Site =

- Maloata Village
- U.S. National Register of Historic Places
- Nearest city: Tapua'ina, American Samoa
- Area: 997 acres (403 ha)
- NRHP reference No.: 87001955
- Added to NRHP: June 12, 1997

The Maloata Village Site is a prehistoric village site on the northwestern coast of the island of Tutuila in the United States territory of American Samoa. The archaeologically sensitive site includes a variety of stone features, principally stone fences and retaining walls, with evidence from excavation of human habitation. Radiocarbon dating from one of its test pits yielded a date range of CE 550–1000, identifying the site as one of the oldest known on the island. According to oral tradition, the Maloata area was reserved for use by relatively high-status chieftains.

The site was listed on the National Register of Historic Places in 1997. The Maloata Village Site has evidence of occupation dating back as early as 550 CE.

== See also ==
- National Register of Historic Places listings in American Samoa
