= Tupapa Site =

- Tupapa
- U.S. National Register of Historic Places
- Nearest city: A'asufou, American Samoa
- NRHP reference No.: 09000852
- Added to NRHP: October 30, 2009

The Tupapa Site is an archaeological site in the uplands of western Tutuila, the largest island of American Samoa. Upland sites are rare on the island, and this one is particularly notable for stratified artifacts across a wide range of time periods. Evidence from this site shows that inland parts of the island were settled earlier than originally thought, and provides information on the exchange and movement of stone tools and tool-making materials.

The site was listed on the National Register of Historic Places in 2009.

== See also ==
- National Register of Historic Places listings in American Samoa
