= A'a Village Site =

- A'a Village (AS-34-33)
- U.S. National Register of Historic Places
- Nearest city: Tapua'ina, American Samoa
- Area: 9.9 acres (4.0 ha)
- NRHP reference No.: 87001956
- Added to NRHP: November 19, 1987

The A'a Village Site, designated "AS-34-33" by archaeologists, is an abandoned village site on the island of Tutuila in American Samoa. Located on a bay (nearly inaccessible by land) on the northwest coast of the island, the site was first surveyed by professional archaeologists in 1985. The site has four distinct areas, in which features interpreted as house foundations have been located, as have rock walls, grave sites, and platform mounds. The site was not known to be occupied within the living memory of nearby residents, and the size of trees in the site suggests it has been abandoned since the 1860s.

Excavations have identified an ancient village, A’a, with continuous or recurrent occupation from approximately 600 BCE into the nineteenth century. It is presently considered the oldest known settlement on Tutuila Island. The site was listed on the National Register of Historic Places in 1987.

== See also ==
- National Register of Historic Places listings in American Samoa
