= Site AS-31-72 =

- U.S. National Register of Historic Places
- Nearest city: Faleniu, American Samoa
- Area: 0.4 acres (0.16 ha)
- NRHP reference No.: 97000431
- Added to NRHP: June 2, 1997

Site As-31-72 is a prehistoric archaeological site on the island of Tutuila in the United States territory of American Samoa. Located on the Tafuna Plain, an inland area on the western half of the island, its principal feature is a long stone wall, 300 metres (980 ft) long with a maximum height of 5.4 metres (18 ft). Set on sloping ground, the top of the wall is roughly level, and is only 2.8 metres (9.2 ft) high at the upper end of the slope. Platforms and other features have been identified during archaeological examination of the structure and its surroundings in the 1990s. Its purpose is unknown; the researchers conjecture it was built because of warfare.

The site was listed on the National Register of Historic Places in 1997.

== See also ==
- National Register of Historic Places listings in American Samoa
