= Rose Island Concrete Monument =

- U.S. National Register of Historic Places
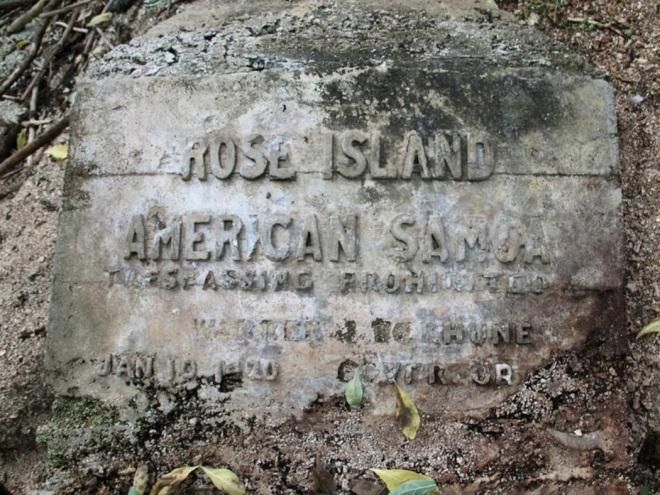

- Location within American Samoa
- Location: Rose Atoll, American Samoa
- Coordinates: 14°32′50″S 168°8′43″W
- Area: less than one acre
- Built: 1920
- NRHP reference No.: 13000920
- Added to NRHP: December 18, 2013

The Rose Island Concrete Monument is a historic commemorative marker on Rose Island, part of Rose Atoll, a remote island located in the far eastern reaches of the territorial waters of American Samoa.

== Appearance ==
The marker is a concrete structure in the shape of a truncated pyramid with a rectangular cross-section. It is 1.53 metres (5.0 ft) wide, 1.59 metres (5.2 ft) high, and 0.74 metres (2.4 ft) deep. On the west side of the marker is raised lettering stating "ROSE ISLAND / AMERICAN SAMOA / TRESPASSING PROHIBITED / WARREN J. TERHUNE / JAN 10 1920 GOVERNOR". A brass plaque on the opposite side of the monument conveys a similar message.

== History ==
The monument was placed in 1920 by the order of Naval Governor Warren J. Terhune during a tour he made of all of the islands of the territory of American Samoa, and serves as a continuing reminder of the American claim to the atoll.

== National Register of Historic Places ==
The monument was listed on the National Register of Historic Places in 2013.

== See also ==
- National Register of Historic Places listings in American Samoa
