= Chris Taliutafa Young =

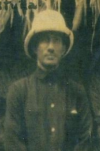
Chris Taliutafa Young under arrest, 1924.

Taliutafa Christopher Leiesilika Young, also known as Christopher Taliutafa Young, Chris Young or Kilisi Young (20 December 1892 – 21 December 1967), was the last claimant to the traditional title Tui Manu'a (paramount chief or king) of Manu'a, a group of islands in the eastern part of the Samoan Islands (present day American Samoa). He was deposed from this title and exiled by American Governor Edward Stanley Kellogg because the idea of monarchy was incompatible with the Constitution of the United States.

Young joined the Mau movement, which acknowledged his royal title and appointed him as one of its leaders.

== Biography ==
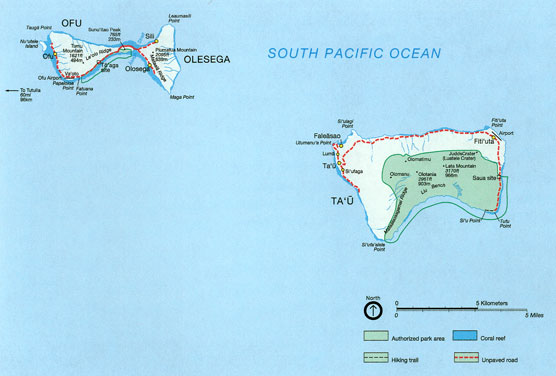
Map of the Manu'a islands

His parents were Arthur Paʻu Young and of Amipelia or Amepelia. His father's heritage was half-Samoan and half-white; his grandfather was either a British or American surnamed Young and his grandmother was a Samoan woman of Fasito'o (located in the western Samoan Islands). On his mother's side, Young was a descendant of Tui Manu'a Taliutafa Tupolo, son of Tui Manu'a Moaatoa, of the anoalo class, the lineal descendants of the Tui Manu'a line. His elder sister Tui Manu'a Matelita ruled briefly from 1891 to 1895.

The family resided in the main two villages of 'o Lumā and Sī'ufaga, on Ta‘ū, the main island of the Manu'a group, where his father was a trader. The family lived in a two-story stone house in the center of the two villages near the Protestant Christian church. The family also had connections and lived in the western Samoan Islands at Apia (capital of German Samoa).

After the short reign of his sister Matelita, the title went to Tui Manuʻa Elisala (from another branch of the family). He ceded the islands to the United States with the Treaty of Cession of Manu'a on 16 July 1904 thus becoming a part of American Samoa. After Elisala's death in 1909, it was noted that "the title effectively died – at least in the eyes of the American government – with him. But the status of the title was not forgotten and the desire for Samoa autonomy lived on."

== Attempted restoration of the Tui Manu'a title ==
In July 1924, a group of native high chiefs within the assembly of the faletolu and anoalo elected Chris Young to the vacant title. Before this point, he had been residing outside Samoa for seventeen years. The restoration was immediately denounced by the colonial authority in American Samoa under Governor Edward Stanley Kellogg who exiled Young and the chiefs who elected him to Pago Pago on Tutuila in order to prevent him form exercising the power of his office.

The American authorities worried that the Samoans were in effect reviving a monarchy or native kingship under their jurisdiction and the ramification it would have on Samoan nationalism. Kellogg also argued that the idea was incompatible with the Constitution of the United States and Young was forbidden to keep the title or return to the island of Ta‘ū. These actions led to native protests in Manu'a. Young also received a letter from the President of the United States concurring with Kellogg's decision ending the succession of the title and stating that the United States' "system of government does not permit it." He was eventually allowed to return to Manu'a.

In 1927, Young sued and brought his case to the High Court of American Samoa. The court recognized Young's right to the title and affirmed his familial relationship to the anoalo. However, it ruled that "If the name Tuimanua were still in existence it is very likely that Chris Young would be legally entitled to the name Taliutafa, but as the Tuimanua has been abolished by law, the name Taliutafa should also be abolished as the perpetuation of this name can lead only to local strife and discord in Manua."

A minority of modern Samoans still regard Chris Young as the last Tui Manu'a, although the majority opinion is that Tui Manu'a Elisala was the last official titleholder.

== See also ==
- Fa'amatai

== Bibliography ==
- Isaia, Malopa'upo (1999). Coming of Age in American Anthropology: Margaret Mead and Paradise. Boca Raton, FL: Universal-Publishers. ISBN 978-1-58112-845-1. OCLC 248540807.
- Krämer, Augustin (1902). Die Samoa-Inseln: Entwuri einer Monographie mit besonderer Berücksichtigung Deutsch-Samoas. Stuttgart: E. Schweizerbartsche Verlagsbuchhandlung. p. 380. OCLC 68181533.
- Krämer, Augustin (1999). The Samoa Islands: An Outline of a Monograph With Particular Consideration of German Samoa : Constitution, Pedigrees and Traditions With 3 Plates, 4 Maps and 44 Illustra. Translated by Theodore Verhaaren. Honolulu: University of Hawaii Press. ISBN 978-0-8248-2219-4. OCLC 44123701.
- Meleisea, Malama (1987). The Making of Modern Samoa: Traditional Authority and Colonial Administration in the History of Western Samoa. Suva, Fiji: Institute of Pacific Studies of the University of the South Pacific. ISBN 978-982-02-0031-9. OCLC 19102181.

Titles in pretence
Preceded by Elisala	Tui Manu'a; 1924	Vacant Title abolished
