= Satala in Lydia =

Titular bishopric

Coordinates: 38°34′43″N 28°16′09″E

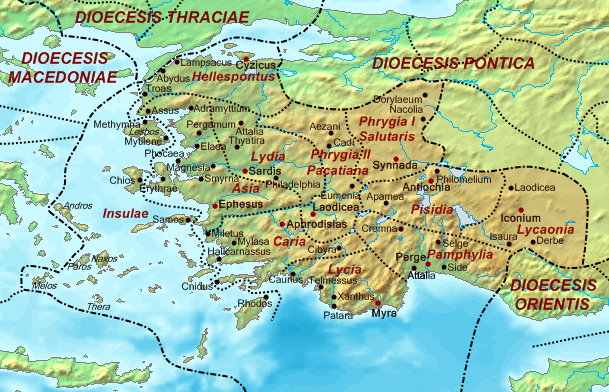
Asia minor 400AD

Satala (Ancient Greek: Σάταλα) or Satala in Lydia was a Roman era city and Bishopric in ancient Lydia.

== Location ==
Its site is located near Adala in Asiatic Turkey.

== Pagan religion ==
The city worshiped the typical mother and son pantheon found throughout Anatolia, and although a temple was built it did not mint coint as the town was only a village. It was part of a decapolis called the Katakekaumene, and May have been its religious center.

== Bishopric ==
The city was also a see in the province of Lydia, and remains a vacant and titular see to this day. It is in the province of Sardis.

Known Bishops

- Andrew (Council of Chalcedon)
- Elpidius of Satala banished after the Council of Constantinople
- Giuliano signed in 458 the letter of the bishops of Lydia to ' Emperor Leo I after the death of Proterius of Alexandria.
- Michael attended the Second Council of Nicaea (787) .
- Philip took part in the Council of Constantinople (879)

Today Satala Lidia survives as titular bishop of the Roman Catholic Church but the seat is vacant since 22 October 1819 .

- Catholic Titular Bishop Nikodem Puzyna September 26, 1814 October 22, 1819.

== See also ==
- Satala, East Turkey
- Satala Cemetery, American Samoa
