= Tui Manu'a Matelita =

Matelita
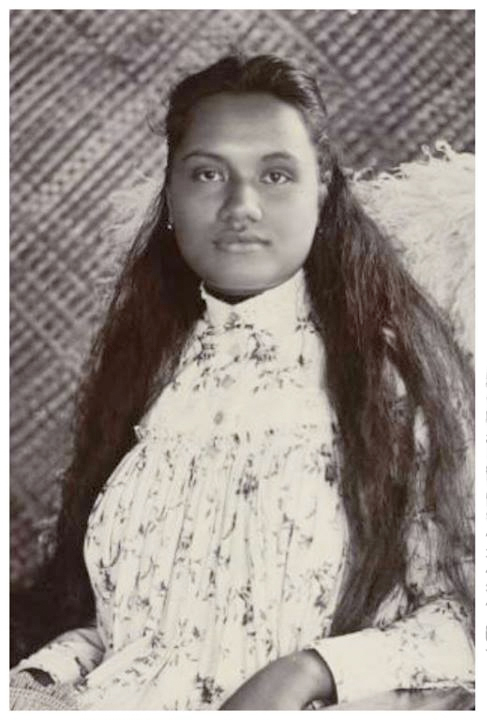
- Photograph of Tui Manu'a Matelita

Tui Manu'a
- Reign: 1891–1895
- Predecessor: Alalamua
- Successor: Elisala
- Born: Margaret Young; 31 December 1872
- Died: 29 October 1895 (aged 22)
- Burial: Tui Manu'a Graves Monument
- Father: Arthur Paʻu Young
- Mother: Amipelia

Tui Manu'a Matelita, born Margaret Young, and also known as Makelita, Matelika or Lika (31 December 1872 – 29 October 1895) was the Tui Manu'a (paramount chief or queen) of Manu'a, a group of islands in the eastern part of the Samoan Islands (present day American Samoa), from 1891 to 1895. During her tenure, she served largely a ceremonial role at her residence on Ta'ū where she received British writer Robert Louis Stevenson. Matelita never married, because she would not marry any of the eligible native chieftains and no other men were regarded as having the proper rank to marry her. She died of illness in 1895, although later reports claimed she died by a more violent means. She was buried in the Tui Manu'a Graves Monument.

== Life ==
She was born on 31 December 1872.

Her parents were Arthur Paʻu Young and Amipelia. Her father's heritage was half-Samoan and half-white; her grandfather was either a British or American surnamed Young and her grandmother was a Samoan woman of Fasito'o (located in the western Samoan Islands). On her mother's side, Matelita was a descendant of Tui Manu'a Taliutafa Tupolo, son of Tui Manu'a Moaatoa, of the anoalo class, the lineal descendants of the Tui Manu'a line.

The family resided in the main two villages of 'o Lumā and Sī'ufaga, on Ta'ū, the main island of the Manu'a group, where her father was a trader. The family lived in a two-story stone house in the center of the two villages near the Protestant Christian church.

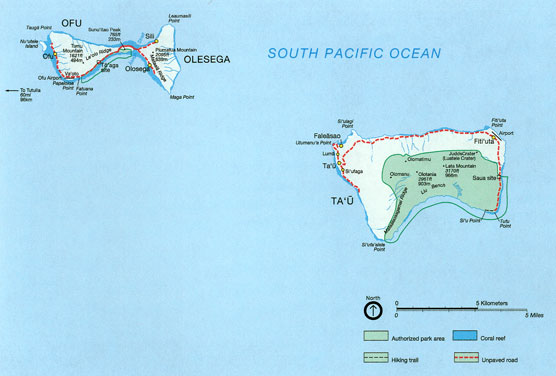
Map of the Manu'a islands

=== Reign ===
After the death of Tui Manu'a Alalamua, the paramount title was left vacant and disputed. An election took place in the faletolu, the council which traditionally decided on the next Tui Manu'a. The two candidates were Matelita and Taofi, a son of Tui Manu'a Tauveve. The anoalo led by Arthur Paʻu Young spoke in favor of Matelita. The decision was not accepted initially by the main line of the Tui Manu'a, but Taofi conceded to Matelita and she became the new paramount chief of the group, ascending to the title on 1 July 1891. She was crowned in a traditional ceremony consisting of feasting, offering of food, kava drinking in the days before and after 13 July 1891.

During her tenure, she primarily filled a ceremonial role and resided on the main island of Ta'ū. In 1895, she gave a speech consecrating a new church. Contemporary and posthumous European and American accounts of her life portray her as a mere figurehead and as a white queen of the South Seas. Matelita never married because she would not marry any of the eligible native chieftains and no other men were regarded as having the proper rank to marry her.

=== Meeting Robert Louis Stevenson ===
Robert Louis Stevenson, a British writer and expatriate in Samoa, visited Matelita and the islands of the Manu'a group in 1894 aboard HMS Curacoa (1878). During his two-day sojourn on the island, he stayed in a guest house belonging to the queen and was served the traditional kava drink. He described how Matelita had little to do and was not able to travel outside the capital village of Ta'ū. In a later letter written to Henry James, Stevenson stated:

The three islands of Manu'a are independent, and are ruled over by a little slip of a half-caste girl about twenty, who sits all day in a pink gown, in a little white European house with about a quarter of an acre of roses in front of it, looking at the palm-trees on the village street, and listening to the surf. This, so far as I could discover, was all she had to do. "This is a very dull place," she said. It appears she could go to no other village for fear of raising the jealousy of her own people in the capital. And as for going about "tapatafaoing," as we say here, its cost was too enormous. A strong able-bodied native must walk in front of her and blow the conch shell continuously from the moment she leaves one house until the moment she enters another.

— Robert Louis Stevenson, July 7, 1894

== Death and legacy ==
Matelita fell ill in September 1895 and died peacefully in her sleep, after the illness, on 29 October 1895.

Later sources claimed she died after a kerosene lamp overturned causing her mosquito net to catch fire while she slept. This is not supported by contemporary sources of the Protestant missionaries which stated she died of illness. A son of her predecessor Alalamua, Elisala was elected as her successor to the title Tui Manu'a in 1899. After Elisala's death, the title was abolished by the United States, which had earlier incorporated the islands as a part of American Samoa. Matelita's brother Chris Taliutafa Young unsuccessfully attempted to claim the Tui Manu'a in 1924.

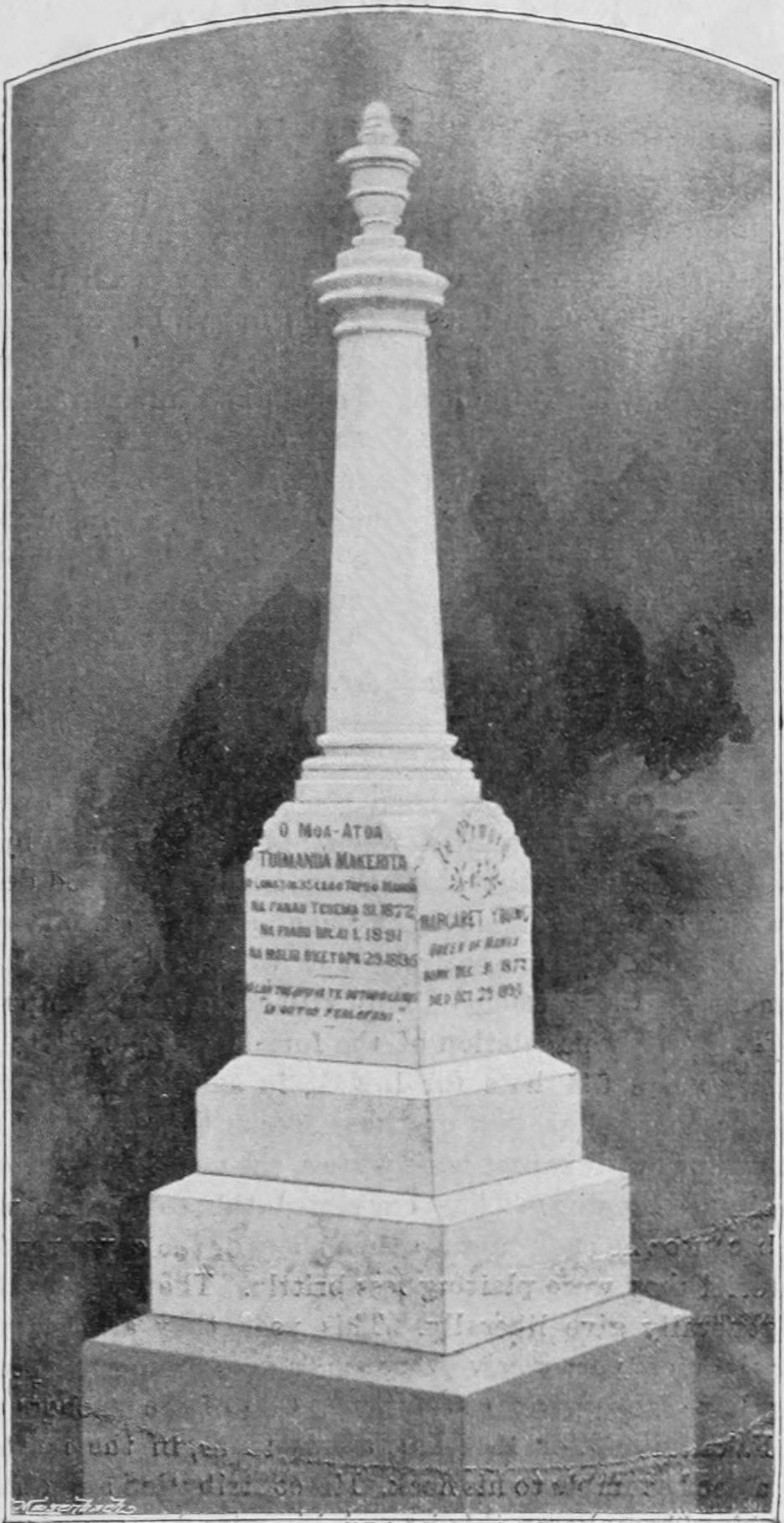
Monument To The Late Queen of Manua, 1896

After her death, she was buried next to some of the preceding Tui Manu'a title holders and eventually her successor Elisala after his death. A marble monument was built over her final resting place. The 6–7 ft (1.8–2.1 m) tombstone, which is the most visible monument in the royal burial ground that is delineated by a stone enclosure, consisted of a round column on a square base. The inscriptions on the base memorializes, in both the English and Samoan language, the life of the Tui Manu'a including the words: These are my last words to you all, "May you live in peace". This grave site known as the Tui Manu'a Graves Monument was listed on the National Register of Historic Places in 2015.

American anthropologist Margaret Mead, who conducted research in Samoa between 1925 and 1926, was given the name Makelita by locals in her memory. During a local marriage ceremony, Mead also wore a dress woven by the late queen.

== See also ==
- Fa'amatai

== Bibliography ==
- American Board of Commissioners for Foreign Missions (September 1896). "Death Of A Samoan Queen". The Missionary Herald. Vol. XCII, no. IX. Boston: American Board of Commissioners for Foreign Missions. p. 378.
- Freeman, Derek (1983). Margaret Mead and Samoa: The Making and Unmaking of an Anthropological Myth. Cambridge, MA: Harvard University Press. p. 318. ISBN 978-0-674-54830-5. OCLC 185406458.
- Isaia, Malopa'upo (1999). Coming of Age in American Anthropology: Margaret Mead and Paradise. Boca Raton, FL: Universal-Publishers. ISBN 978-1-58112-845-1. OCLC 248540807.
- Krämer, Augustin (1902). Die Samoa-Inseln: Entwuri einer Monographie mit besonderer Berücksichtigung Deutsch-Samoas. Stuttgart: E. Schweizerbartsche Verlagsbuchhandlung. p. 380. OCLC 68181533.
- Krämer, Augustin (1999). The Samoa Islands: An Outline of a Monograph With Particular Consideration of German Samoa : Constitution, Pedigrees and Traditions With 3 Plates, 4 Maps and 44 Illustra. Translated by Theodore Verhaaren. Honolulu: University of Hawaii Press. ISBN 978-0-8248-2219-4. OCLC 44123701.
- London Missionary Society (September 1895). "Address By A Samoan Queen". The Chronicle of the London Missionary Society. No. 45. London: John Snow & Company. p. 231. OCLC 8040189.
- London Missionary Society (February 1896). "Death Of The Young Queen of Manua". The Chronicle of the London Missionary Society. Vol. V, no. 50. London: London Missionary Society. p. 46. OCLC 269250730.
- London Missionary Society (September 1896). "Monument To The Late Queen of Manua". The Chronicle of the London Missionary Society. Vol. V, no. 57. London: London Missionary Society. p. 209. OCLC 269250730.
- Meleisea, Malama (1987). The Making of Modern Samoa: Traditional Authority and Colonial Administration in the History of Western Samoa. Suva, Fiji: Institute of Pacific Studies of the University of the South Pacific. ISBN 978-982-02-0031-9. OCLC 19102181.
- National Park Service (19 November 2015). Tui Manu'a Graves Monument (PDF). Washington, DC: National Park Service. Archived from the original (PDF) on 16 February 2016.
- "Queen of Manua, One of the Beauties of the South Sea Islands". The Morning Herald. No. 816. Baltimore. 16 February 1896. p. 30.
- Stevenson, Robert Louis (1907). "Letter of Robert Louis Stevenson To Henry James – Vailima, July 7, 1894". In Colvin, Sidney (ed.). The Letters of Robert Louis Stevenson to His Family and Friends. Vol. II. New York: C. Scribner's Sons. pp. 409–413. OCLC 29865467.

Preceded by Alalamua	Tui Manu'a; 1891–1895	Succeeded by Elisala
