= Blunts Point Battery =

- Blunts Point Naval Gun
- U.S. National Register of Historic Places
- U.S. National Historic Landmark
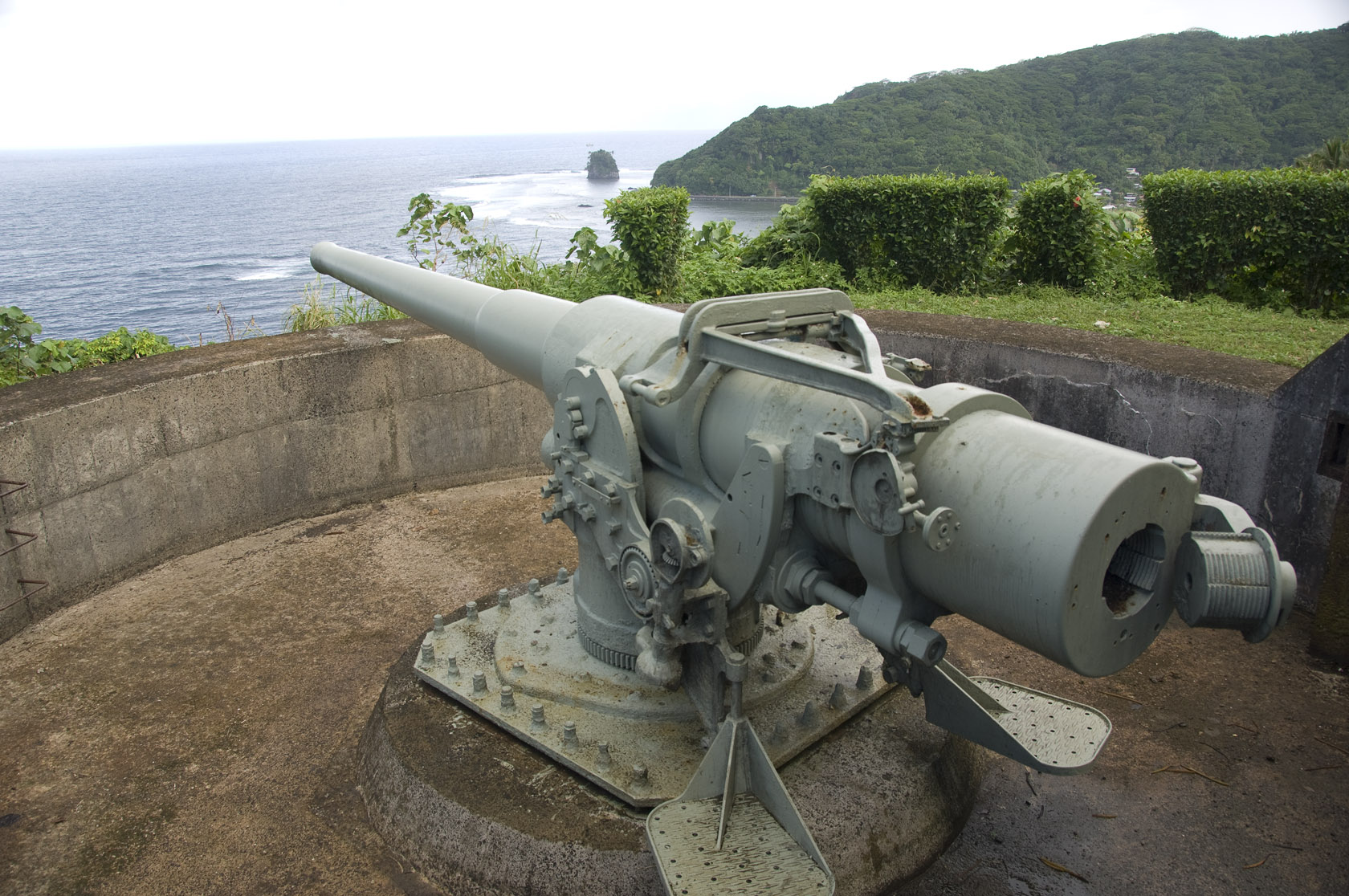

- Location within American Samoa
- Nearest city: Pago Pago, American Samoa
- Coordinates: 14.285417°S 170.676947°W
- Built: 1942
- NRHP reference No.: 73002128

Significant dates
- Added to NRHP: April 26, 1973
- Designated NHL: May 28, 1987

The Blunts Point Battery, also known as Blunts Point Naval Gun or Matautu Ridge Gun Site, is a gun battery on Matautu Ridge near Pago Pago, American Samoa. It was part of the fortification of the Samoan Islands which took place after the attack on Pearl Harbor, and is a rare example of a World War II Pacific coastal gun which remains in relatively pristine condition. It was declared a National Historic Landmark in 1987.

On August 28, 1941, the two guns shot sixteen rounds at a target floating in Pago Pago Harbor. The guns’ discharge could be heard for miles away. Approximately one week after the guns were tested, ten rounds were shot from each of the two recently placed guns at Breakers Point.

== Description and history ==
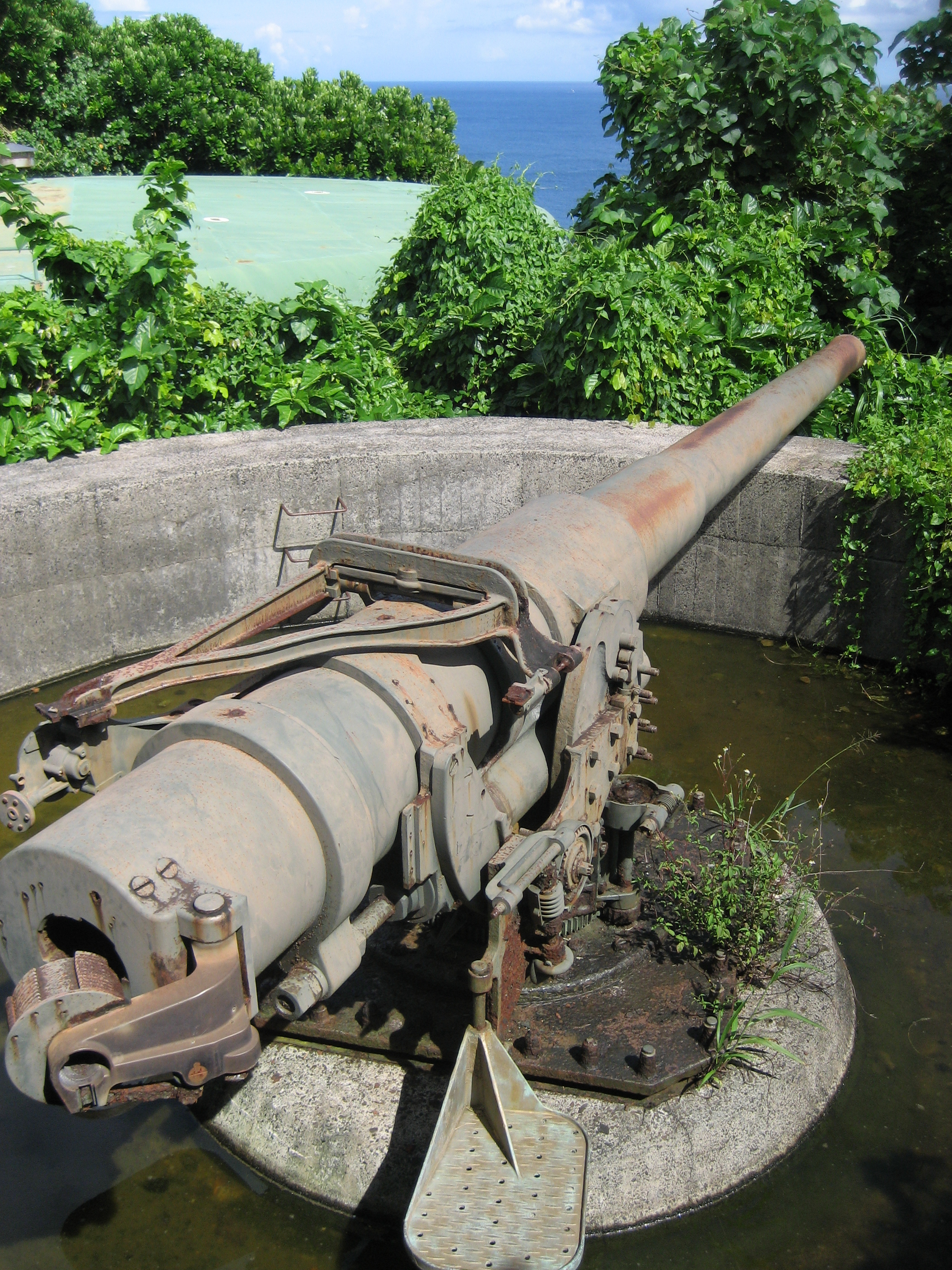
As seen in 2007.

Blunts Point is a projection on the west side of the mouth of Pago Pago Harbor, on the south side of the island of Tutuila, southeast of the village of Utulei. (Note: Likely namesakes of the point are Simon F. Blunt, or Edmund March Blunt or one of his sons, George or Edmund.) Two 6-inch (150 mm) naval guns are mounted at a point about 200 feet (61 m) above sea level, at this point, which has a commanding view of the harbor entrance. The guns are mounted in circular concrete structures with a parapet about 4 feet (1.2 m) high around the outside. A short way below the emplacement is a magazine which is built into the hillside. The battery has recently been restored and is in good condition. It is accessible to the public via a moderately difficult hiking trail.

The tensions of World War II prompted the United States government to begin fortifying American Samoa in 1940. United States Marines installed the two guns at Blunts Point, and another two on the east side of the harbor at Breakers Point. Following the Japanese attack on Pearl Harbor in December 1941 and the capture of Guam shortly thereafter, American Samoa became of critical importance as the only major American base in the western Pacific, and it was further fortified in anticipation of attack. Although no attack ever came, American Samoa was a critical supply and training point for American military actions in the Pacific.

== See also ==
- Breakers Point Naval Guns, across the harbor
- List of United States National Historic Landmarks in United States commonwealths and territories, associated states, and foreign states
- National Register of Historic Places listings in American Samoa
- Naval Base Samoa
