= Tui Manuʻa =

Title of the ruler of the Manuʻa Islands

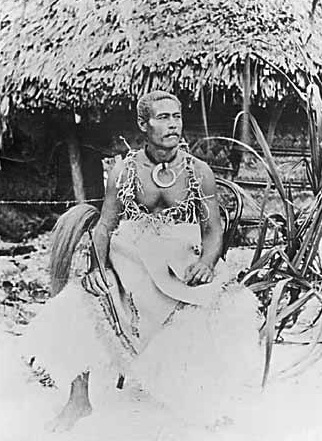
Tui Manuʻa Elisala was the last title holder.

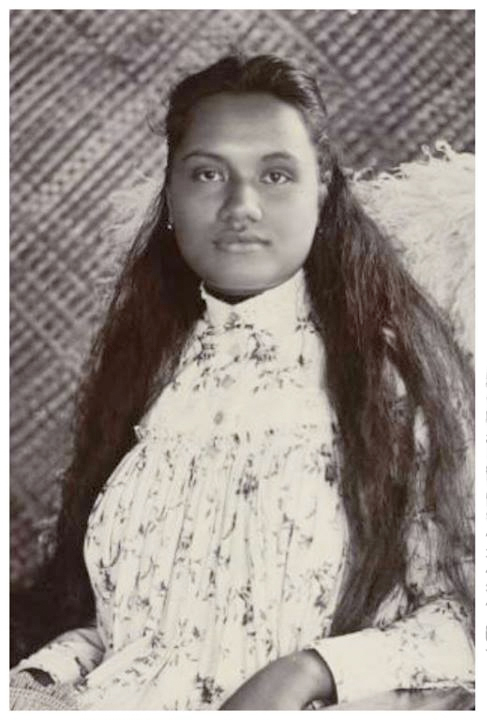
Tui Manuʻa Matelita was the Tui Manuʻa from 1891 to 1895.

Tui Manuʻa was the title of the ruler or paramount chief of the Manuʻa Islands in present-day American Samoa, which expanded to become the Tui Manuʻa Confederacy, sometimes called the Samoan Empire. Samoan expansionism and projected hegemony in Oceania began with the founding of the Tui Manuʻa title. Traditional oral literature of Samoa and Manuʻa talks of a widespread Polynesian network or confederacy (or "empire").

== History ==
The Tui Manuʻa is the oldest title of ancient Samoa and all of Polynesia. According to Samoan oral histories, the first Tui Manuʻa was the son of the Samoan supreme god, Tagaloa. In Samoan lore, the islands of Manuʻa (Ofu, Olosega, and Taʻu) are always the first lands to be created or drawn from the sea; consequently the Tui Manuʻa is the first human ruler mentioned. This "senior" ranking of the Tui Manuʻa title continues to be esteemed and acknowledged by Samoans despite the fact that the title itself has not been occupied since the American takeover in the early 20th century.

=== Tui Manuʻa empire ===
Traditional oral literature of Samoa and Tonga speaks of a wide spread Samoa’atoa empire that was ruled by the successive Tui Manuʻa dynasties. Manuʻa genealogies and religious oral literature also suggest that the Tui Manuʻa had long been one of the most prestigious and powerful paramounts of the Pacific and the first pre-eminent ruler of all Samoa. Oral history suggests that the Tui Manuʻa chiefdom ruled Samoa, Tonga, parts of Fiji, Rarotonga and Hawai’i. Commerce and exchange routes between the western Polynesian societies is well documented and it is speculated that the Tui Manuʻa dynasty grew through its success in obtaining control over the oceanic trade of currency goods such as finely woven ceremonial mats, whale ivory "tabua", obsidian and basalt tools, chiefly red feathers, and seashells reserved for royalty (such as polished nautilus and the egg cowry).

=== Decline and isolation ===
Eventually, the maritime empire began to decline and a new empire rose from the south headed by the first Tu’i Tonga ʻAhoʻeitu who according to the oral traditions of the noble Ata family in Tonga, was a son of the Tui Manu’a. Other oral traditions suggest that ʻAhoʻeitu was the son of Tangaloa ‘Eitumatupu’a from Manu’a and a Tongan woman ‘Ilaheva Va’epopua of Niuatoputapu. Around 950 AD, Tuʻi Tonga ʻAhoʻeitu started to expand his rule outside of Tonga. Samoa's Savaii, Upolu and Tutuila islands were to eventually succumb to Tongan rule, and would remain part of the empire for almost 400 years. However, as the ancestral homeland of the Tuʻi Tonga dynasty and the abode of deities such as Tagaloa ʻEitumatupuʻa, Tonga Fusifonua, and Tavatavaimanuka, the Manuʻa islands of Samoa were considered sacred by the early Tongan kings and thus were never occupied by the Tongans, allowing for it to remain under Tui Manuʻa rule.

By the time of the tenth Tuʻi Tonga Momo, and his successor, Tuʻitātui, the Tuʻi Tonga's empire had grown to include much of the former domains of the Tui Fiti and Tui Manuʻa. The expulsion of the Tongans in the 13th century from neighbouring Upolu and Savaii would not lead to the islands returning to Tui Manuʻa but to the rise of a new dominant polity in the western isles: the Malietoa, whose feats in liberating Samoa from the Tongan occupants led to the establishment of a new political order in Upolu and Savaii which remained unchallenged for nearly 300 years. Although the Tui Manuʻa would never again regain rulership of the surrounding islands, it is permanently held in high esteem as the progenitor of the great Samoan and Tongan lineages.

=== Colonization and the "abolition" of the Tui Manuʻa title ===
The Manuʻa islands were grouped with Tutuila and Aunuʻu as the United States possession now called American Samoa. The presidency of the United States, and the military authorities of the US Navy, supplanted the native administrative role of the Tui Manuʻa, through the arrests of chiefs of the Tui Manuʻa and two trials of the Tui Manuʻa, one on an American warship off the coast of Taʻu, called the "Trial of the Ipu". On 6 July 1904 Tui Manuʻa Elisala officially ceded the islands of Manuʻa to the United States through the signing of the Treaty of Cession of Manuʻa. He was relegated the office of Governor of Manuʻa for the term of life and the understanding that the Tui Manuʻa title would follow him to the grave. He died on 2 July 1909.

After a fifteen-year break, the office was revived in 1924 when Chris Young, a member of the Anoalo clan of the Tui Manuʻa family and the brother of Tui Manuʻa Matelita who reigned between 1890 and 1895, was named Tui Manuʻa by the general assembly of the Faletolu and Anoalo. American officials were worried that the Manuʻans were restoring a "king" who would cause trouble for the administration. Governor Edward Stanley Kellogg opposed the bestowal and had the new Tui Manuʻa brought to Tutuila where he was prevented from exercising the powers of his office. The Governor did not recognise the title on the basis that a monarchy was incompatible within the framework of the Constitution of the United States, stating that the previous Tui Manuʻa had pledged under duress to be the last person to hold the title. The descendants of Tui Manuʻa are numerous.

== List of Tui Manuʻa ==
1. Satiailemoa
2. Tele (brother of Satiailemoa)
3. Maui Tagote
4. Maugaotele
5. Folasa or Taeotagaloa
6. Faʻaeanuʻu I or Faʻatutupunuʻu
7. Saoʻioʻiomanu (Saʻo or eldest son of Faʻaeanuʻu I)
8. Saopuʻu (second son of Faʻaeanuʻu I)
9. Saoloa (third son of Faʻaeanuʻu I)
10. Tuʻufesoa (fourth son of Faʻaeanuʻu I)
11. Letupua (fifth son of Faʻaeanuʻu I)
12. Saofolau (sixth son of Faʻaeanuʻu I)
13. Saoluaga
14. Lelologatele (eldest son of Saofolau)
15. Aliʻimatua (eldest son of Lelologatele)
16. Aliʻitama (second son of Lelologatele)
17. Tui Oligo (grandson or son of Aliʻitama's daughter)
18. Faʻaeanuʻu II (eldest son of Tui Oligo)
19. Puipuipo (second son of Tui Oligo)
20. Siliʻaivao (third son of Tui Oligo)
21. Tuimanufili (daughter of Faʻaeanuʻu II)
22. Faʻatoʻalia Manu-o-le-faletolu (eldest son of Tuimanufili)
23. Segisegi (son of Faʻatoʻalia)
24. Siliave (daughter of Faʻatoʻalia)
25. Tui-o-Pomelea (son of Siliave)
26. Tui-o-Lite (or Tui Aitu) (son of Tui-o-Pomelea)
27. Toʻalepai (son of Tui-o-Lite)
28. Seuea (daughter of Toʻalepai)
29. Salofi (brother of Seuea)
30. Levaomana (son of Salofi)
31. Taliutafapule (son of Salofi and brother of Levaomana)
32. Taʻalolomana Muaatoa
33. Tupalo
34. Seiuli
35. Uʻuolelaoa (killed in a war with Fitiuta)
36. Fagaese
37. Tauveve
38. Visala
39. Alalamua
40. Matelita or Makelita (1872–1895), r. 1891–1895
41. Elisala or Elisara (died 1909), r. 1899–1909
42. Chris (Kilisi) Taliutafa Young (1924)

Tui Manua family tree

Tui Manu'a family
Falesoā clan	Avaloa clan	Anoalo clan
Tui Manuʻa; Alalamua
Taofi, title candidate	Tui Manuʻa Elisala	Tui Manuʻa Matelita
Chris Taliutafa Young

== See also ==
- Faʻamatai, chiefly system of Samoa

== Bibliography ==
- Isaia, Malopaʻupo (1999). Coming of Age in American Anthropology: Margaret Mead and Paradise. Boca Raton, Florida: Universal-Publishers. ISBN 978-1-58112-845-1.
- McMullin, Dan Taulapapa. 2005. "The Passive Resistance of Samoans to US and Other Colonialisms", article in "Sovereignty Matters" , University of Nebraska Press.
- Office of the Governor. 2004. Manuʻa ma Amerika. A brief historical documentary. Manuʻa Centennial. 16 July 1904. 16 July 2004. Office of the Governor, American Samoa Government. 20 p.
- Samoa News
- Linnekin, Hunt, Lang & McCormick (University of Hawaii Pacific Islands Cooperative Botanic Studies Institute)
