= Satala, American Samoa =

Coordinates: 14°16′16″S 170°41′32″W

Satala
- Village
- Location within American Samoa
- Country: United States
- Territory: American Samoa
- County: Maoputasi

Area
  - Total: 0.15 sq mi (0.39 km^{2})
- Elevation: 125 ft (38 m)

Population (2020)
  - Total: 218
  - Density: 1,924.2/sq mi (742.9/km^{2})
- Time zone: UTC−11 (Samoa Time Zone)
- ZIP code: 96799
- Area code: +1 684

Satala is one of Pago Pago’s constituent villages and is located in Pago Pago Bay on Tutuila Island. Satala is in Maoputasi County in the Eastern District of the island. It is home to the historic Satala Cemetery, which is listed on the U.S. National Register of Historic Places, and the government-owned Ronald Reagan Marina Railway Shipyard.

It is also the location of the Satala Power Plant on the northwest coast of Pago Pago Harbor, which previously generated all of the power for Tutuila Island. It is located directly across the street from the coast. American Samoa Power Authority, which operates the ASPA Satala Power Plant, is a non-profit semi-autonomous government agency. The power plant itself is a 13,215-square-foot (1,227.7 m^{2}) structure on Satala's shoreline. It was the primary power source for the shipyard, the industrial areas on the waterfront, and the power grid on the eastern end of Tutuila. After the 2009 tsunami, sea-water entered the building and eventually submerged it and all its equipment in saltwater. The power capacity was lost as a consequence of the damages.

Satala was the location of BFK, Inc. and where they constructed the Kneubuhl Warehouse near the docks, in order to offload cargo as the sole agent for Matson Shipping Lines. In the 1960s, it became the site of the Pacifica Foods processing plant.

As of the 2010 U.S. census, Satala was home to 61 housing units and 297 residents, up from 162 residents as of 1950.

== History ==
On May 4, 1900, the U.S. Navy acquired 4.3 acres of land in Satala to create a cemetery for its personnel. This site holds historical importance as the first Western cemetery in American Samoa and is notable for including civilians and often non-Samoans alongside naval members. In 2006, Satala Cemetery was officially listed on the U.S. National Register of Historic Places.

In 1946, the first Seventh-day Adventist Church in American Samoa was built at Satala. In 1951, the first Seventh-day Adventist elementary school in the territory was established at Satala.

In 1968, the new Marina Railway at Satala opened, built to service ships up to 800 tons and aimed at servicing the fast-growing Oriental fishing fleets.

As the Satala Power Plant was destroyed by the 2009 tsunami, a new power plant was built and dedicated in May 2017. The new plant is quieter and located on higher ground than the previous plant. The multimillion-dollar project had a total cost of $56 million and three funding sources: $36.5 million from the U.S. Federal Emergency Management Agency (FEMA), $17.5 million from insurance proceeds, and $2.5 million from the American Samoa Power Authority (ASPA).

Ronald Reagan Shipyard underwent four months of repairs in 2018, funded with $1 million from federal Capital Improvement Project monies. The repairs came after “30-plus years of the slipway being neglected”, according to American Samoa Shipyard Service Authority CEO Moefa’auo Bill Emmsley. The improvements were designed to alleviate bigger vessels from having to travel afar for required repairs.

== See also ==
- Satala Cemetery, developed by the United States Navy after 1900. Listed on the U.S. National Register of Historic Places in 2006.
- American Samoa Power Authority
- Ronald Reagan Shipyard
