= Henry Francis Bryan =

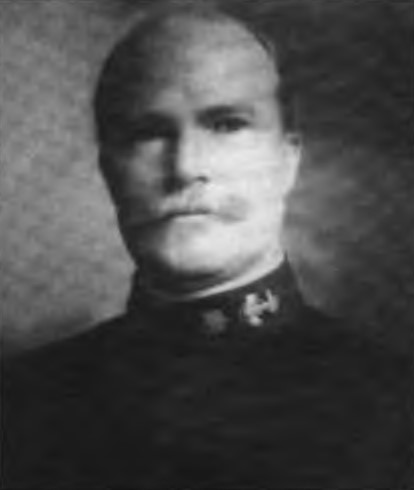

Governor of American Samoa
- In office March 17, 1925 – September 9, 1927
- Preceded by: Edward Stanley Kellogg
- Succeeded by: Stephen Victor Graham

Personal details
- Born: May 3, 1865 Cincinnati, Ohio, US
- Died: March 19, 1944 (aged 78) Meriden, Connecticut, US
- Spouse: Elizabeth Champlin Badger Bryan
- Education: United States Naval Academy
- Occupation: Naval officer
- Awards: Navy Cross

Military service
- Allegiance: United States
- Branch/service: United States Navy
- Rank: Rear Admiral
- Commands: USS Monocacy; Office of Naval Intelligence; USS Leviathan; Special Service Squadron

Henry Francis Bryan (May 3, 1865 – March 19, 1944) was a United States Navy Rear Admiral and the governor of American Samoa. He served as governor from March 17, 1925, to September 9, 1927. Bryan was one of only three naval governors of the territory who had retired from naval service before serving as governor, the others being John Martin Poyer and his immediate predecessor, Edward Stanley Kellogg. In the Navy, he had numerous commands, and served in the Spanish–American War. His largest command was the Special Service Squadron.

== Life ==
=== Early life ===
Bryan was born in Cincinnati, Ohio, on May 3, 1865.

=== Naval career ===
Bryan became a cadet at the United States Naval Academy on May 2, 1883, and graduated in 1887. He served on both USS Isla de Luzon and USS Newark. He also served on USS Monocacy, which he commanded. Bryan fought in the Spanish–American War. He later filled a post in the Office of Naval Intelligence, where he also briefly served as director from December 1913 to January 1914. He had been promoted to captain on July 1, 1913.

During World War I, Bryan commanded USS Leviathan, for which he was later awarded the Navy Cross. He was frocked as a rear admiral on September 21, 1918. After the war, Bryan was given command of the Special Service Squadron, which patrolled the Caribbean Sea. In 1921, he and his squadron were commanded to protect United States interests during contention in Costa Rica and Panama.

Bryan retired from active duty at his permanent rank of captain on December 31, 1921. He was credited with additional active duty time for his service as naval governor of American Samoa from 1925 to 1927. On June 21, 1930, Bryan was advanced to rear admiral on the retired list.

== Governorship ==
Bryan assumed the governorship on March 17, 1925. While governor, he established the American Samoa Department of Communications. Bryan was one of only three naval governors of the territory who had retired from naval service before serving as governor, the others being John Martin Poyer and Edward Stanley Kellogg.

Bryan served as Governor during a period of peace following the turbulent years of Mau activities. He completed the work on a bill of rights, which had begun under Governor Edward Stanley Kellogg, and incorporated it into the Code of American Samoa. During his tenure, he oversaw the construction of two new dispensaries, one in Amouli and another in Ofu. Additionally, Governor Bryan imposed a ban on malagas.
