= Edward Stanley Kellogg =

US Navy Captain & former Governor of American Samoa (1870-1948)

Governor of American Samoa
- In office September 4, 1923 – March 17, 1925
- Preceded by: Edwin Taylor Pollock
- Succeeded by: Henry Francis Bryan

Personal details
- Born: August 20, 1870 Morrisania, Bronx, New York, U.S.
- Died: January 8, 1948 (aged 77) National Naval Medical Center, Bethesda, Maryland, U.S.
- Spouse: Emily Wendell Taylor Kellogg
- Education: United States Naval Academy
- Occupation: Naval officer

Military service
- Allegiance: United States
- Branch/service: United States Navy
- Years of service: 1892–1920, 1923–1925
- Rank: Captain

Edward Stanley Kellogg (August 20, 1870 – January 8, 1948) was a United States Navy Captain who served as the governor of American Samoa. Kellogg graduated from the United States Naval Academy in 1892 and joined the Naval Engineer Corps. He served as an assistant engineer on numerous ships and participated in the Spanish–American War. He retired in 1920, and became governor three years later, making him only one of two Naval Governors of American Samoa to hold the office following retirement from the service. As Governor, Kellogg asserted the authority of the United States over the tribal chiefs of the islands. He removed the title of Tu'i Manu'a from Chris Young, claiming it implied king-like authority over the people of American Samoa, resulting in widespread protest among the islands' people. Kellogg died at the National Naval Medical Center in Maryland and was buried at Arlington National Cemetery.

== Life ==
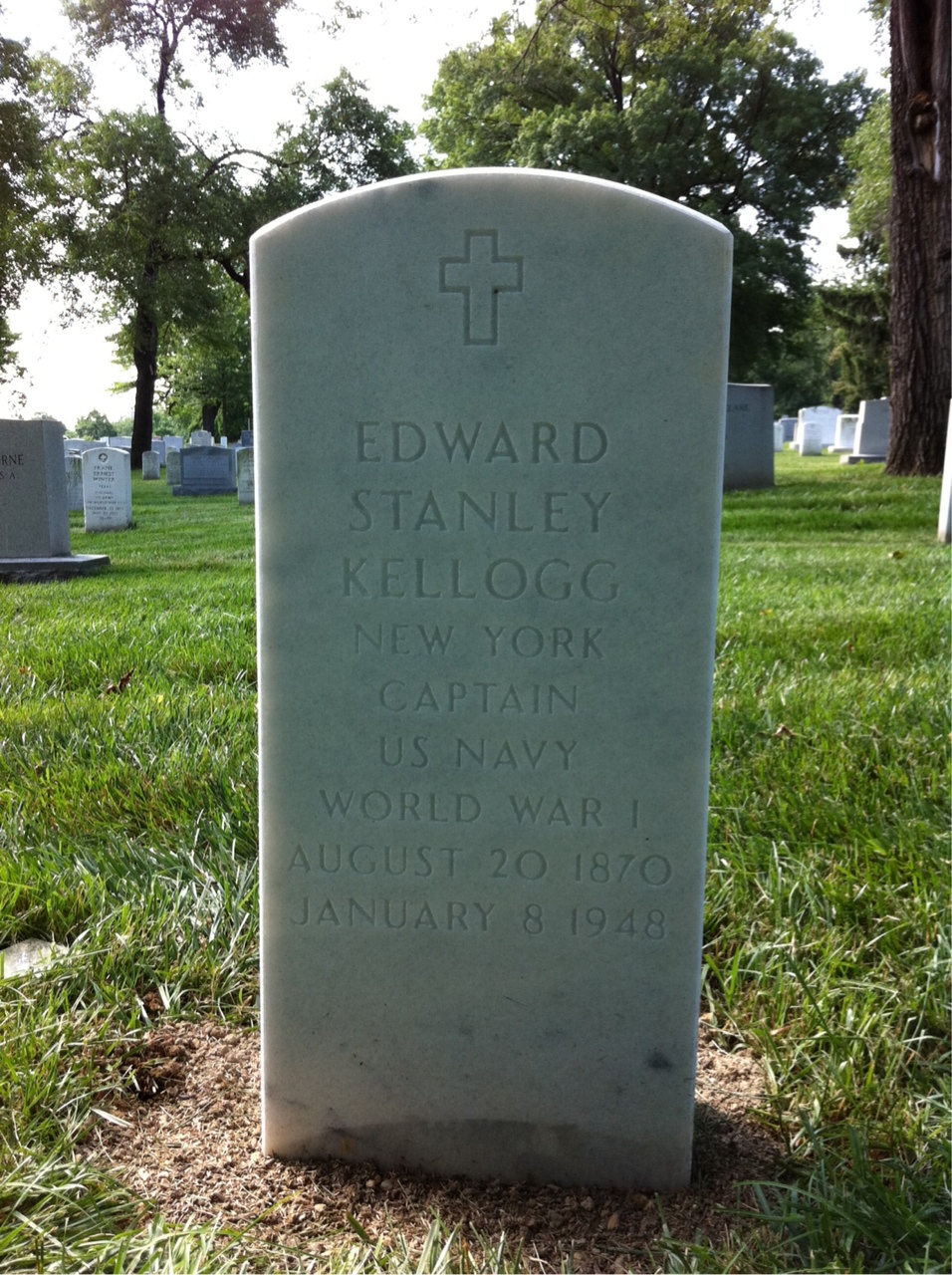
Kellogg's grave at the United States Naval Academy Cemetery in Annapolis, Maryland.

Kellogg was born on August 20, 1870, in Morrisania, Bronx. He died on January 8, 1948, at the National Naval Medical Center in Bethesda, Maryland. He was buried at Arlington National Cemetery on January 12, 1948.

== Naval career ==
Kellogg was appointed to the United States Naval Academy from New York on May 18, 1888, graduating on June 3, 1892. In 1894, he became an assistant engineer in the Naval Engineer Corps. He served on USS San Francisco before being transferred to USS Yorktown on April 26, 1895. As a lieutenant, he served on USS Hartford. During the Spanish–American War, Kellogg was the assistant engineer aboard USS Hist. In 1920, he retired from the Navy with the rank of captain.

== Governorship ==
Kellogg took the office of Governor of American Samoa on September 4, 1923, and served until March 17, 1925. As governor, he prohibited certain native death ceremonies, imposing a small fine and imprisonment on those who continued to practice the customs. Along with John Martin Poyer, Kellogg is one of only two Naval Governors of American Samoa who served in the office following retirement from the Navy. He came into some dispute with Chris Young, a man elected as Tu'i Manu'a, or king, of American Samoa by several chiefs. Kellogg argued that the idea was incompatible with the Constitution of the United States and denied Young the title. Kellogg also dealt with the removal of Young and his placement under house arrest, after other Samoan chiefs called him a "disturbing influence". Inaccurate rumors were spread that Kellogg had banished him from the islands, causing widespread protest and declarations that he was ruling as a despot.

== Bibliography ==
- "The Campaign of Coronel and the Falklands August 1, 1914, to March 14, 1915" (PDF). The Coast Artillery Journal. 59 (1): 1–16. July 1923. Archived from the original (PDF) on October 2, 2012.
