= Rose Atoll =

Atoll in American Samoa

- Atoll
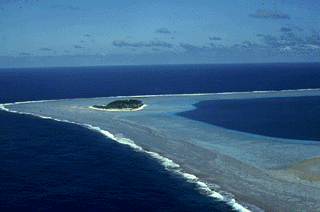
- Rose Atoll

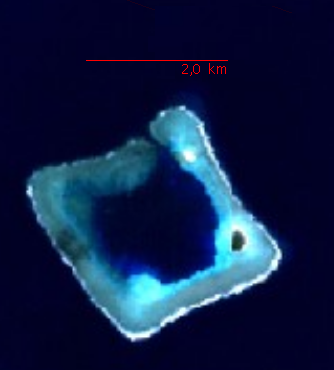
- NASA satellite imagery

- Location within Oceania Location within Pacific Ocean
- Coordinates: 14°32′48″S 168°09′07″W
- Territory: American Samoa

Population
  - Total: 0
  - Density: 0/km^{2} (0/sq mi)

Rose Atoll Marine National Monument
- IUCN category V (protected landscape/seascape)
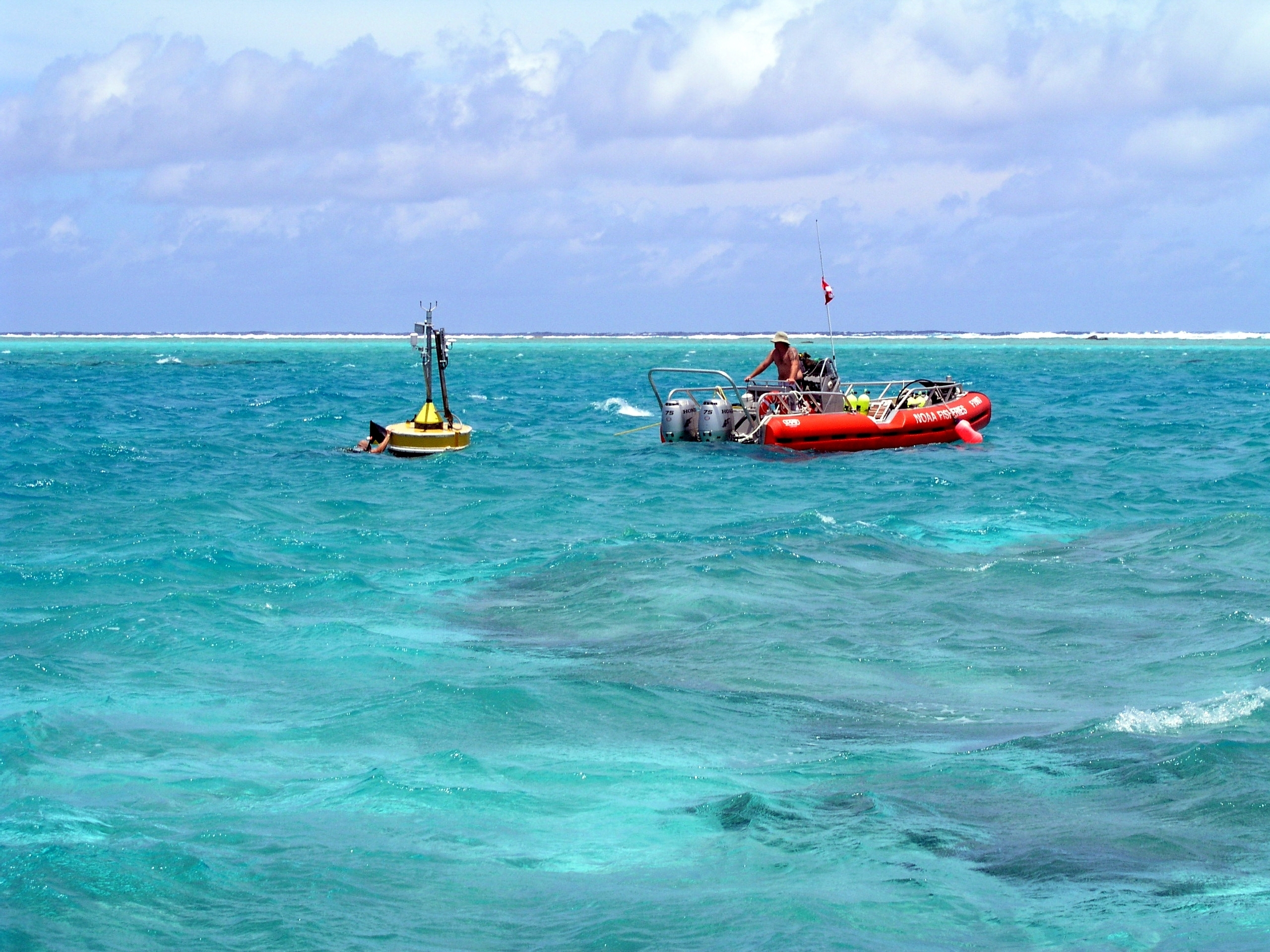
- Oceanographers deploy a buoy inside Rose Atoll
- Interactive map of Rose Atoll Marine National Monument
- Coordinates: 14°32′45″S 168°09′00″W
- Area: 8,571,633 acres (3,468,817 ha)
- Created: 2009
- Governing body: U.S. Fish and Wildlife Service
- Website: Rose Atoll Marine National Monument

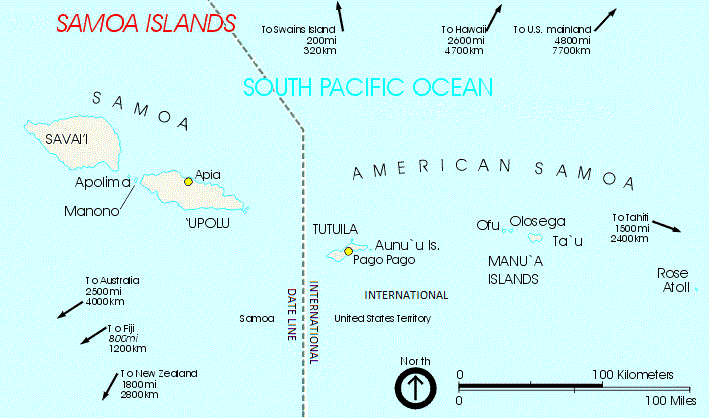
Map of the Samoan Islands, showing the location of Rose Atoll

Rose Atoll, sometimes called Rose Island or Motu O Manu ("Bird Island") by people of the Manu'a Islands, is an oceanic atoll within the U.S. territory of American Samoa. An uninhabited wildlife refuge, it is the southernmost point belonging to the United States, about 170 miles (150 nmi; 270 km) to the east of Tutuila, the principal island of American Samoa. The land area is just 0.05 km^{2} (12 acres) at high tide. The total area of the atoll, including lagoon and reef flat amounts to 6.33 km^{2} (1,560 acres). Just west of the northernmost point is a channel into the lagoon, about 80 metres (260 ft) wide. There are two islets on the northeastern rim of the reef, larger Rose Island, 3.5 metres (11 ft) high, in the east and the non-vegetated Sand Island, 1.5 metres (5 ft) high, in the north.

The Rose Atoll Marine National Monument that lies on the two outstanding islands of the atoll is managed cooperatively between the U.S. Fish and Wildlife Service and the government of American Samoa.

The nearly square atoll is one of the smallest in the world, measuring only 2.6 km × 2.7 km (1.6 mi × 1.7 mi). It is also the only atoll of the Samoan Islands. (Swains Island is also an atoll, but only politically part of American Samoa, not geographically.)

Rose Atoll is quite isolated, the closest island to it being Taʻū, 140 km (87 mi) to the WNW.

== History ==
The earliest Western sighting was June 13, 1722, during the voyage of Jacob Roggeveen, who called it Vuil Eiland "useless island". The name Rose Island comes from its sighting by Louis de Freycinet in 1819. He named it after his wife Rose. While the second woman to circumnavigate the globe, Rose de Freycinet was the first to tell her tale. In his official report Louis de Freycinet records that 'I named Rose Island, from the name of someone who is extremely dear to me'. Soon afterwards, in 1824, it was seen by the expedition under Otto von Kotzebue, who named it Kordinkov after his First Lieutenant.

Apollo 10 returned to Earth in the ocean near Rose Atoll on May 26, 1969. The three astronauts were treated to a lavish welcome at Pago Pago International Airport before being flown to Hawai’i.

== Protection ==
The island was protected as the Rose Atoll National Wildlife Refuge in 1973 with 39,066 acres (61.04 sq mi; 46.09 sq nmi; 158.09 km^{2}), only 20 acres (8.1 ha) of which is emergent. The wildlife refuge is managed by the United States Fish and Wildlife Service.

Rose Atoll Marine National Monument is a United States National Monument covering 8,571,633 acres (13,393.18 sq mi; 10,113.45 sq nmi; 34,688.17 km^{2}). It was established in 2009. At the signing of the order establishing the monument, President George W. Bush noted that "the waters surrounding the atoll are the home of many rare species, including giant clams and reef sharks—as well as an unusual abundance of rose-colored corals". The monument's marine areas were incorporated into the National Marine Sanctuary of American Samoa in 2014; they are co-managed by the Fish and Wildlife Service and the Office of National Marine Sanctuaries, a component of the National Oceanic and Atmospheric Administration (NOAA).

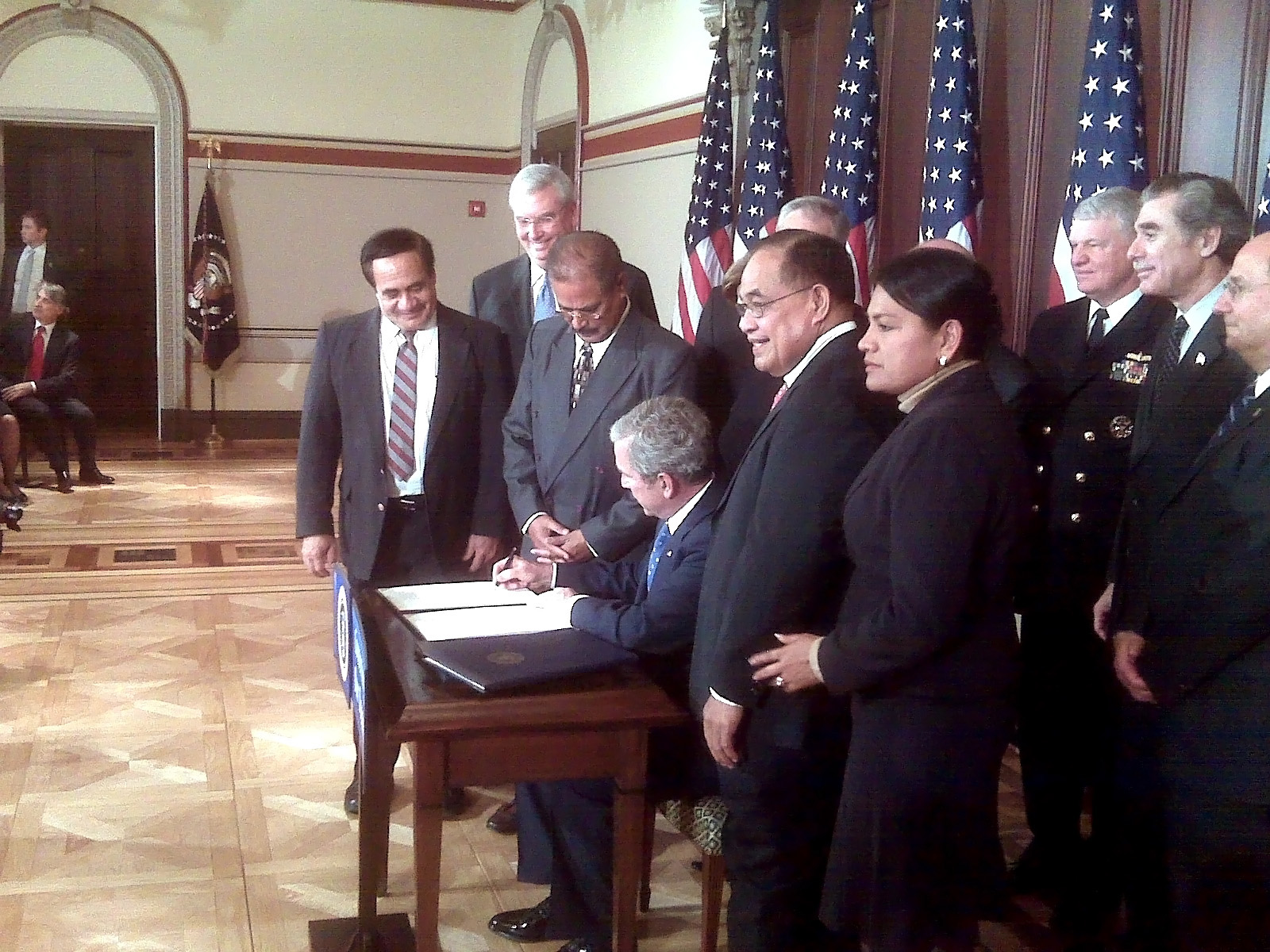
President Bush signs paperwork establishing the Rose Atoll Marine National Monument on January 6, 2009.

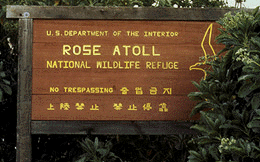

== Fauna ==
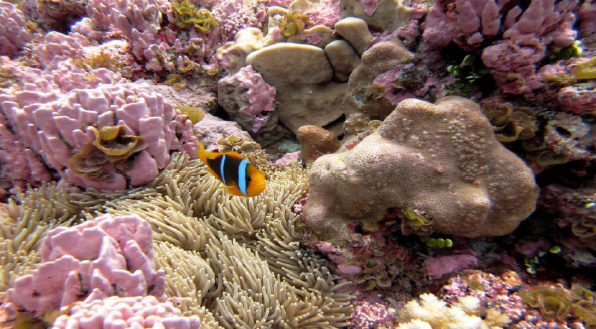
Pink coralline algae at Rose Atoll.

Rose Atoll contains the largest populations of giant clams, nesting seabirds and rare reef fish in all of American Samoa. The fish population is different from the rest of the region due to a high concentration of carnivorous fish and low concentration of herbivorous fish. Almost 270 different species of fish have been recorded in the last 15 years. Tuna, mahi-mahi, billfish, barracuda and sharks reside outside the lagoon. In deeper waters, tunicates and stalked crinoids have been spotted by scuba expeditions. Sea mammals such as the endangered humpback whale and the dolphin genus Stenella also use the waters.

The atoll is a critical nesting habitat for the threatened green turtle and the endangered hawksbill turtle. The turtles migrate between American Samoa and other Pacific island nations. Their nesting season is between the months of August and February.

It is a nesting site for rare species of petrels, shearwaters, and terns. Approximately 97% of American Samoa's seabird population resides on Rose Atoll. Each of the 12 bird species is federally protected. Red-footed boobies and greater and lesser frigate birds nest in the buka trees. Black noddies and white terns nest in the middle and lower branches. The root system is used by reef herons and red-tailed tropic birds. Other birds can be found in the Pisonia forest, the only one left in Samoa. The atoll has been recognised as an Important Bird Area (IBA) by BirdLife International because it supports a breeding population of some 400,000 sooty terns, as estimated in 1974.

== See also ==
- Rose Island Concrete Monument
- List of national monuments of the United States
