= Pago (American Samoa) =

Shield volcano

Coordinates: 14°15′55.36″S 170°41′17.14″W

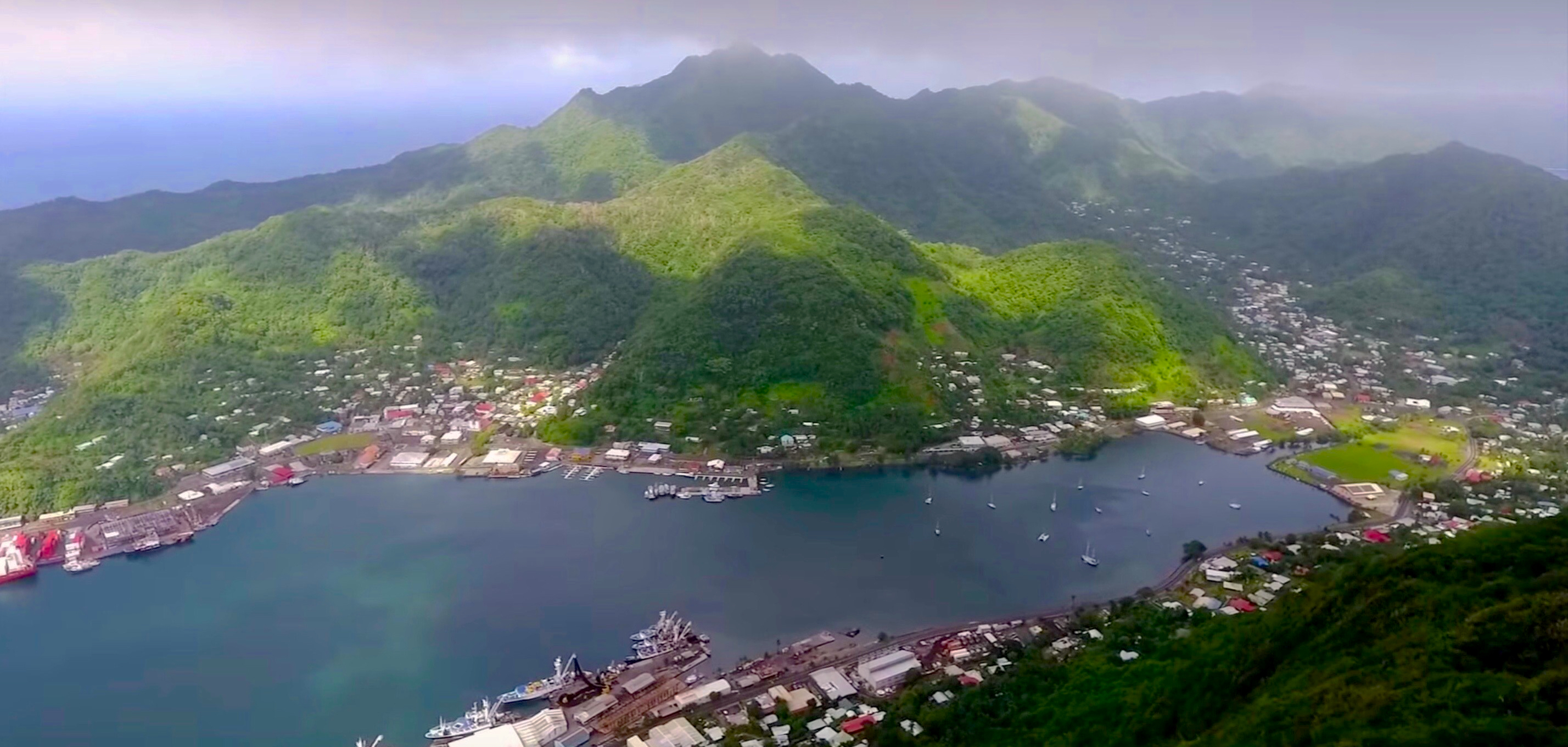
Pago Pago Harbor has been eroded out of the southeastern portion of the caldera.

Pago is a shield volcano in the center of Tutuila Island, the largest island of American Samoa in the South Pacific Ocean.

The volcano was formed by subaerial eruptions between 1.54 and 1.28 million years ago. It has been estimated that the volcano was as high as 3,937 feet (1,200 m) above sea level. Activity on Pago Volcano ended with emplacement of trachyte bodies with ages of 1.03 ± 0.01 Ma.

The Pago Volcano caldera was formed 1.27+-0.02 million years ago. The caldera's dimensions are estimated at 5.9 miles (9.5 km) in length and 3 miles (4.8 km) in width. The southeast part of the caldera makes up Pago Pago Harbor, one of the world's largest natural harbors. The northwest rim, Maugaloa Ridge, creates the southern border of the National Park of American Samoa. Mount ʻAlava is part of the caldera rim of the Pago Volcano.
