= Satala Cemetery =

Historic place in American Samoa

- U.S. National Register of Historic Places
- U.S. Historic district
- Location within American Samoa
- Location: AS 1, W of Satala, Lalopua, American Samoa
- Coordinates: 14.2707°S 170.6949°W
- Area: 0.6 acres (0.24 ha)
- Built: 1900
- Architect: U.S. Navy
- NRHP reference No.: 05001110
- Added to NRHP: October 19, 2006

The Satala Cemetery is located on the north side of Pago Pago Harbor on the island of Tutuila, the largest in American Samoa. The cemetery was established, apparently late in the 19th century, by the United States Navy, as an interment site for foreigners on the island. Traditional Samoan burial practice is to bury family members on their property, a method not available to outsiders. One section of the cemetery is dedicated to graves of Korean fishermen.

The cemetery was listed on the National Register of Historic Places in 2006. It was damaged by a tsunami that struck the island in 2009.

== See also ==
- National Register of Historic Places listings in American Samoa
