= Fagasā, American Samoa =

Fagasā
- Village
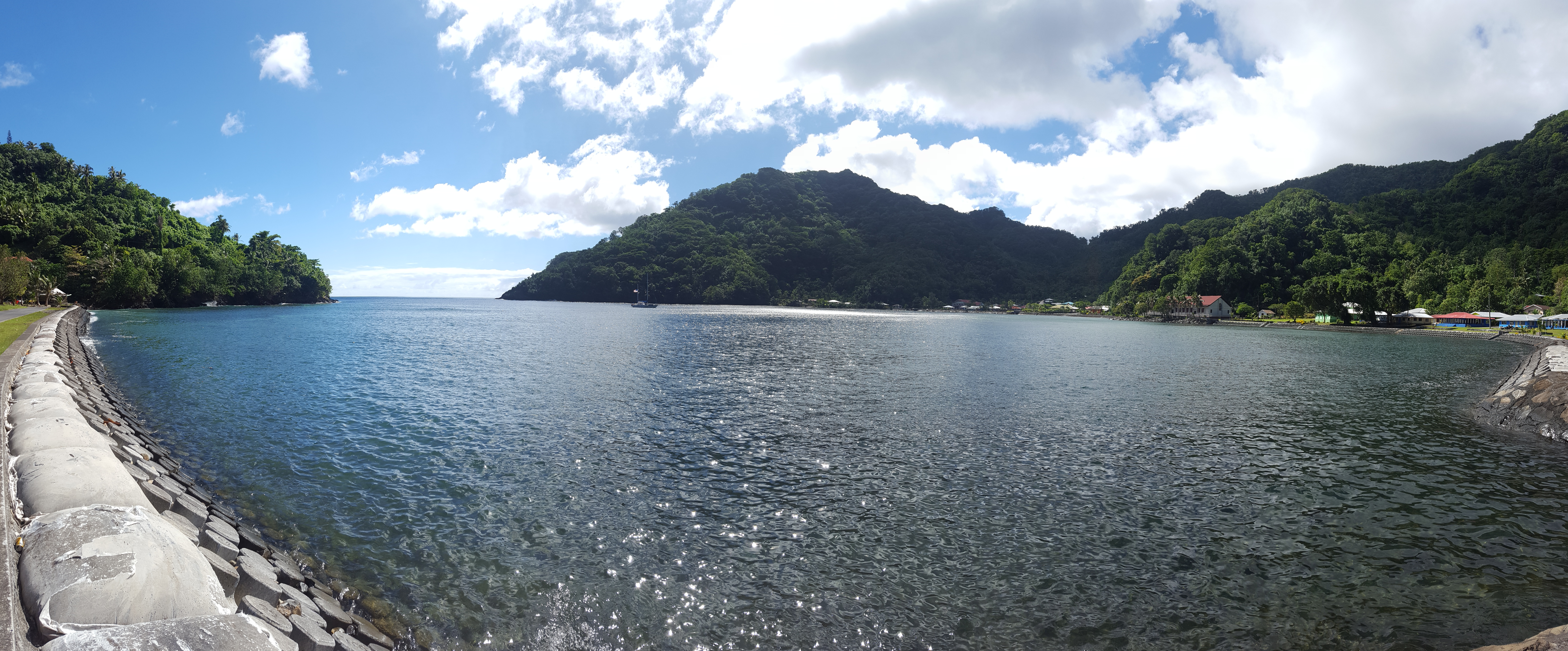
- Panorama from Forbidden Bay near Fagasa
- Etymology: Samoan: "Sacred bay"
- Location within American Samoa
- Coordinates: 14°17′14″S 170°43′06″W
- Country: United States
- Territory: American Samoa
- County: Ituau County

Area
  - Land: 1.65 sq mi (4.27 km^{2})

Population (2020)
  - Total: 577

Fagasā is a village in the Eastern District of Tutuila Island in American Samoa. The village lies by Fagasa Bay, on the north shore of the island. Its name is Samoan and translates to "Forbidden Bay." The village borders the Tutuila-section of National Park of American Samoa.

Fagasa has two sub-villages: Fagatele (Big Bay) on the west side, where Leʻatele School is located, and Fagaleʻa on the east side, by the chapel of the Congregational Christian Church in American Samoa (CCCAS).

Forbidden Bay has been described as one of the most beautiful bays in the South Pacific Ocean. It can be reached by boat or from Fagasā by foot.

Fagasā Pass, near the Vaipito Valley border with Pago Pago, serves as the main access point for trails to both Mount ʻAlava and Mount Matafao. The Mount ʻAlava trail begins on the north side of Route 5, while the Mount Matafao trail starts on the south side, directly across from the Mount Alava trailhead.

A porpoise sanctuary is located in Fagasa Bay.

== Etymology ==
The name Fagasā translates to "Sacred Bay." The village's high chiefs, elders and orators all believe the name derived from the legend of Liavaʻa.

Fagasā consists of two sub-villages: Fagatele, which means “Great bay", and Fagale’a, which means "Short bay".

The village is sometimes mistakenly referred to as Fungasar.

== History ==
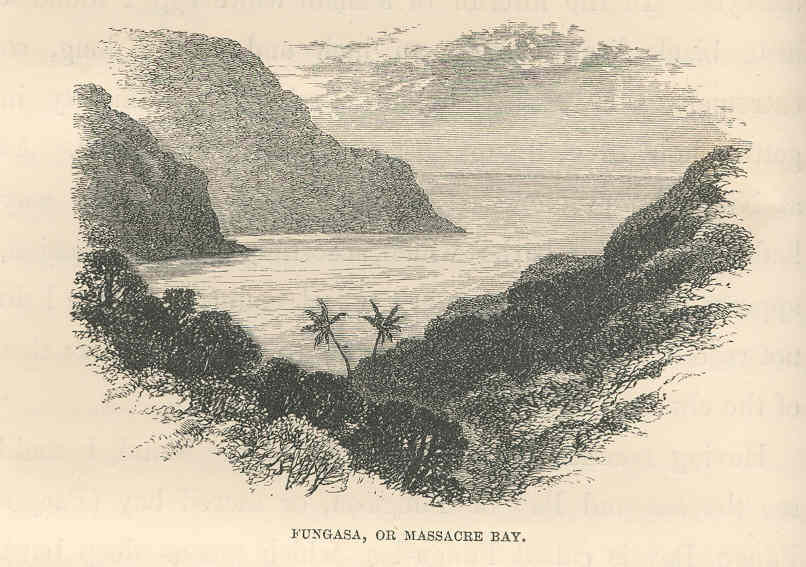
1873 illustration.

In December 1787, the first recorded European landing on Tutuila was made by the French navigator Jean-François de Galaup, comte de Lapérouse. This event took place during the larger Lapérouse expedition, commissioned by King Louis XVI to explore the region and advance French interests in influence and commerce. Lapérouse himself oversaw the mission, serving as commander of the ship Boussole. On December 10, 1787, a key portion of the expedition touched shore at Fagasā. At Fagasā, Lapérouse discovered a notable bay flanked by lush mountains and a substantial, well-established village. The inhabitants of Fagasā greeted the newcomers without hostility, allowing the French to negotiate for supplies. In addition to abundant fruit and a variety of livestock, the expedition secured more than 500 pigs, chickens, and even a few dogs, all considered valuable provisions for their journey. Most importantly, the French were granted permission to draw fresh water from two local streams—later identified as the Le’ele and Fagasli. Lapérouse, though impressed by the overall exchange at Fagasā, recorded some unease about the unpredictability of the islanders’ behavior, noting the challenges that might arise if a small shore party had to rely solely on shipboard artillery for protection. Despite this caution, the cordial reception at Fagasā remained positive. On December 11, seeking to obtain additional water and supplies, Fleuriot De Langle’s party ventured to Aʻasu onboard L’Astrolabe, about five miles west of Fagasā. Unlike the relatively peaceful dealings at Fagasā, the encounter at Aʻasu ended in conflict. In a sudden outbreak of violence, twelve French sailors and thirty-nine Samoans lost their lives.

In June 1836, a group of five British London Missionary Society (LMS) missionaries, accompanied by their wives aboard the Dunottar Castle, anchored in Fagasa Bay. At Fagasā, reverend Archibald Murray went ashore and asked for the leading authority in the area. He was sent to the High Chief Mauga at Pago Pago. He returned on foot to Fagasā with Pomare, the chief's son, and rejoined his colleagues before setting sails for Upolu Island. The formal Christianization of Tutuila and Manuʻa Islands is said to stem from this voyage.

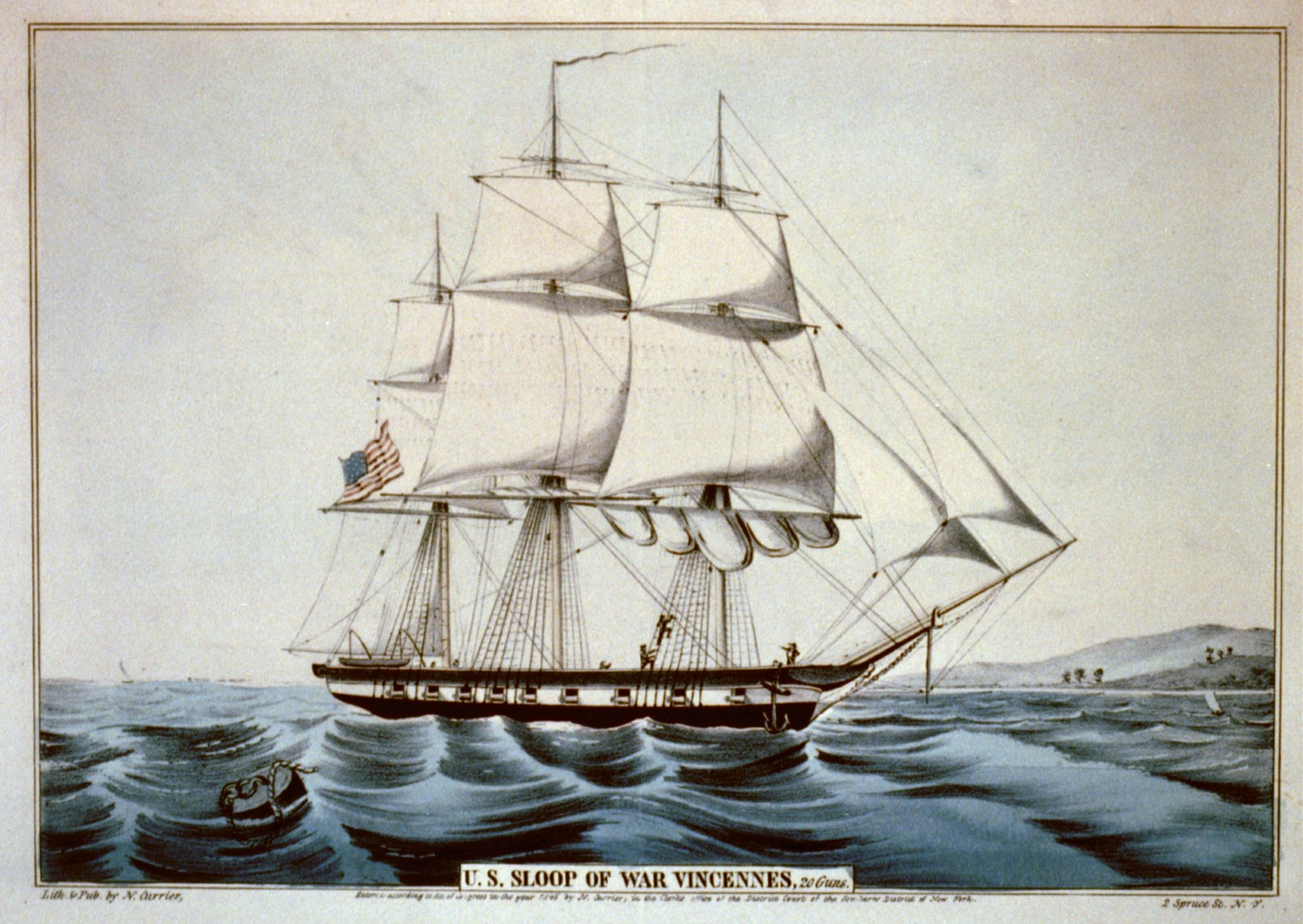
USS Vincennes

On October 17, 1839, Commander Charles Wilkes — leader of the United States Exploring Expedition — visited Fagasā aboard the USS Vincennes, having been invited by Chief Toa (Tua). Overall, he found the villagers to be quite agreeable. According to the chief, in earlier “heathen” times, Toa's aitu had been a freshwater eel, which he regularly fed at a nearby stream — until, eventually, he made a meal of it. Midshipman William Reynolds was assigned to surveying duty under Lieutenant Joseph Underwood. In Fagasā, they encountered Midshipman Wilkes Henry, Charles Wilkes’ nephew, who had been stationed there to measure tides and make other observations. Heavy rains prevented any surveying the following day, so Reynolds and Underwood spent the morning and afternoon in the village's “big house,” conversing with Henry and the local residents. When they returned the next day, they found that Commodore Wilkes, accompanied by Robert Waldron and nine other sailors, had crossed the island on foot to visit Henry. U.S. interest in Tutuila Island, and especially in the village of Pago Pago, arose during this surveying expedition. Funding for the expedition had originally been requested by President John Quincy Adams in 1828.

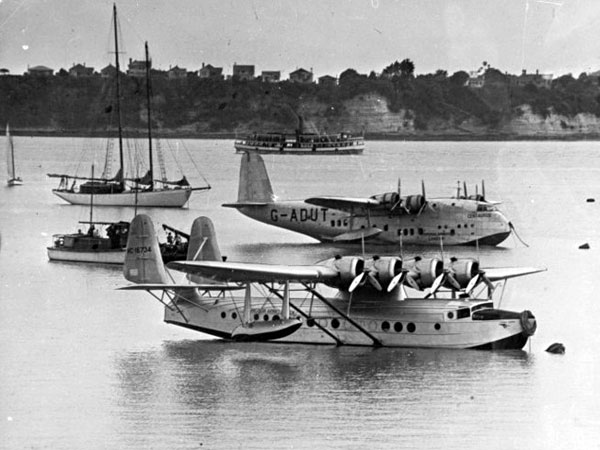
Fagasā was the nearest village to the crash site of the Samoan Clipper, which exploded on January 11, 1938.

On January 11, 1938, the Samoan Clipper departed Pago Pago Harbor and subsequently exploded. The village of Fagasā, being the closest to the crash site, responded by deploying its own fautasi (longboat) to assist in the search efforts. Search teams recovered small pieces of clothing but found no survivors. All six crew members, including Captain Edwin Musick, perished in the crash. The seaplane tender USS Avocet was also dispatched to search for survivors; it found no survivors, only an oil slick, several uniform coats, and pieces of aluminum floating on the surface.

During World War II, roads were cut across Tutuila along the routes of old footpaths, including the trail between Fagasā and Pago Pago, once crossed on foot by Reverend Archibald Murray and Commodore Charles Wilkes over its thousand-foot summit. The trail was transformed into a road—narrow in sections and prone to washouts, yet serviceable for vehicles of all sizes.

In the early hours of January 11, 1942, a Japanese submarine surfaced near Fagasā and then sent more than a dozen shells over the mountain and onto the vicinity of the Naval Station Tutuila. There was only one direct hit, which was the only Japanese-owned structure in the archipelago (owned by Frank Shimasaki). Other shells caused light damage to the naval dispensary, landed behind Centipede Row, and hit the seawall outside the customs house.

In March 1991, a prehistoric adze quarry was discovered at Fagasā and was recognized as a possible major stone tool production site for the region and islands as far away as the Marquesas.

== Demographics ==
Year	Population
2020	577
2010	831
2000	900
1990	717
1980	657
1970	649
1960	442

=== Religion ===
Fagasa's main church is the Congregational Christian Church in American Samoa (CCCAS). It was the first religion to be established in Fagasa. At the end of World War II, villagers decided to construct the first chapel in the village. Although transportation was difficult, the villagers carried materials and supplies over their shoulders from the Mafa Pass and down to Fagasa. The church is located right where the steep winding road ends and the flatland begins.

== Geography ==
Fagasā is situated on the north shore of Tutuila, 2 miles (3.2 km) southwest of Pago Pago. A stream with fales beside it follows the steep valley down to Fagasa. The buses to Fagasa go every hour from the bus station at Fagatogo Market in Pago Pago. Fagasā is located in the Nofoa area of Itūʻau County.

Fagasa lies northwest of Pago Pago and is separated from the populated southern shore of Tutuila by a range of high mountains. It is located within a half-moon bay and enclosed by rugged mountain ridges. The road leading to Fagasa is a cut-off to the left from the main road in Pago Pago proper. A 10-minute drive connects Fagasa to the capital. The drive's highest point is the Mafa Pass, an open tunnel where visitors will first see Sacred Bay in Fagasa. Numerous monuments of historical sites have been put up by the American Samoa National Park here, and a walking trail to the Mount ʻAlava Towers takes off from the Mafa.

The soil is rich for vegetation and forests. Families have developed the land near their homes for agricultural crops. Fagasa is surrounded by a mountain range from either end. Surrounding mountains include the Fuaau Ridge, Taumata Mountain, Leele Mountain, and Fatifati Mountain. Leele Stream flows down from Leele Mountain and through the village before discharging into the Pacific Ocean. Another stream, Leua, flows from Fatifati Mountain and down through Fagasa. On clear days, one can see the mountains of Upolu Island over the horizon.

The shoreline from Fagasā Bay to Vatia Bay is within the National Park of American Samoa and contains the longest stretch of undisturbed and uninhabited coast on Tutuila Island. The forest along this coastline has never been disturbed, and steep cliffs are found here along with scenic coves such as Tāfeu Cove near Vatia. There are also waterfalls, streams, and forest-covered ridge tops. Fagasā Harbor is characterized by reefs and rocks extending from the shore, which narrow its inner part. Within Fagasā Bay, a rocky point divides the village of Fagasā into two sections. The village is traversed by two creeks, Leua and Agasii, both flowing through the village and emptying into the bay. A small stone pier is located in the village.

=== Fagasā Pass ===
At Fagasā Pass right outside of town is the primary trailhead for the Mount ʻAlava Trail. This 7-mile roundtrip trail leads to a mountain summit with panoramic views of Pago Pago Harbor and surrounding areas of Tutuila Island. The trail goes through dense rainforest in the National Park, home to a variety of tropical bird species and fruit bats. Halfway up the mountain is a coconut- and banana plantation.

== National park ==
The Tutuila unit of the National Park of American Samoa is situated between the villages on Fagasā on the west and Āfono on the east. The southern boundary follows along the crest of the Mount ʻAlava-Maugaloa Ridge above Pago Pago Harbor from Āfono Pass to Fagasā Pass. Access to the Tutuila portion of the park is via the road which runs along the perimeter of the upper Pago Pago Harbor. Lateral roads lead to Fagasa Pass the park's western end. From the Fagasā Pass National Park entrance, there is an unpaved road leaving hikers to the top of Mount ʻAlava. The road was originally constructed in order to service the television transmitters on the mountain. Road signs marking entry points to the National Park can be found near the trailhead at Fagasā Bay, and along the national park side of Fagasā Bay in order to mark the park's boundary from the ridge top down to Siufaga Point.

Jagged Mount ʻAlava dominates the scenery on northern Tutuila Island. A 6-mile (9.7 km) roundtrip trail leads up to the 1,585 ft. peak. The view from atop Mount ʻAlava contains both the south and north sides of the island's Pacific coasts as well as the deep inlet in Pago Pago Harbor.

Boat tours arranged by the government regularly sail around the north coast villages of Fagasā, Āfono, and Vatia.

== Attractions ==
World War II relics can be seen on the mountain ridges and shorelines of Fagasa. The American Marines left Fagasa on August 15, 1945, after it was officially declared that the Japanese forces had surrendered to the United States. On the shorelines of Fagafue and Sika, one can still find the pillbox forts or gun turrets the Marines utilized as coastal lookouts during World War II.

There is a marine life sanctuary in Fagasa Bay. Tourists often hike from Mafa Pass to the Mount ʻAlava Towers, which is the main transmitting antennas of the American Samoa Government's TV station.

== Notable people ==
- Fofō Iosefa Fiti Sunia
- Al Noga
- Isaac Sopoaga
- Atuatasi Ena Atuatasi, Fono-Governor Liaison Officer, representative to the South Pacific Commission, and Special Assistant to Governor Tauese Sunia.
