= Samoan Clipper =

1938 aviation accident in American Samoa

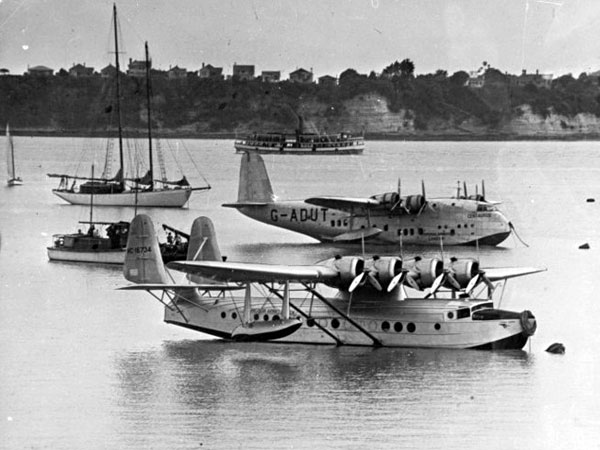
- NC16734 (foreground), the aircraft involved, seen in Auckland, New Zealand in 1937.

Accident
- Date: January 11, 1938
- Summary: In-flight explosion
- Site: Pago Pago, American Samoa; 14°8′20″S 170°51′0″W

Aircraft
- Aircraft type: Sikorsky S-42B
- Aircraft name: Samoan Clipper (formerly Pan American Clipper II)
- Operator: Pan Am
- Registration: NC16734
- Flight origin: Honolulu, Hawaii
- 1st stopover: Kingman Reef
- 2nd stopover: Pago Pago, American Samoa
- Destination: Auckland, New Zealand
- Passengers: 0
- Crew: 7
- Fatalities: 7
- Survivors: 0

Samoan Clipper was one of ten Pan American Airways Sikorsky S-42 flying boats. It exploded near Pago Pago, American Samoa, on January 11, 1938, while piloted by aviator Edwin Musick. Musick and his crew of six died in the crash. The aircraft was carrying only airmail and express freight; no passengers were aboard.

The aircraft developed an oil leak shortly after taking off from Pago Pago harbor, and the crew decided to return to port. However, the S-42, fully loaded with fuel, was too heavy to land safely in the limited space of the harbor, so the crew elected to dump fuel before landing. While fuel dumping was in progress, there was a fire and explosion which destroyed the aircraft, killing all aboard. The exact cause of ignition for the fire could not be determined.

== Background ==
On March 17, 1937, the Pan American Clipper departed San Francisco Bay to inaugurate a 7,000-mile South Pacific air route linking the United States and Australia. Later renamed the Samoan Clipper, it pioneered the San Francisco–Kingman Reef–Pago Pago–Auckland corridor, arriving in Pago Pago Bay on March 24 during the first leg from Hawaiʻi to Auckland. The flying boat operated for nine months before exploding shortly after departing Pago Pago on January 11, 1938.

== Accident ==
Shortly after departing Pago Pago on January 11, 1938, Captain Edwin Musick reported an oil leak and prepared to jettison fuel for a safe landing. His final transmission at 8:27 a.m. read, “We are going to dump gas and we can’t use the radio during the dumping. Stand by.” The fuel apparently flowed over the lowered flaps onto a hot exhaust manifold, igniting and causing the tanks to explode. The USS Avocet found no survivors - only an oil slick, uniform coats, and aluminum debris. The Samoan Clipper carried six crew, including Musick. The village of Fagasā, being the closest to the crash site, responded by deploying its own fautasi to assist in search efforts.
