= Fagasa =

Fagasa may refer to:

- Fagasa, Samoa
- Fagasā, American Samoa
