= Mount ʻAlava =

Mountain in the National Park of American Samoa

Coordinates: 14°15′55″S 170°41′18″W

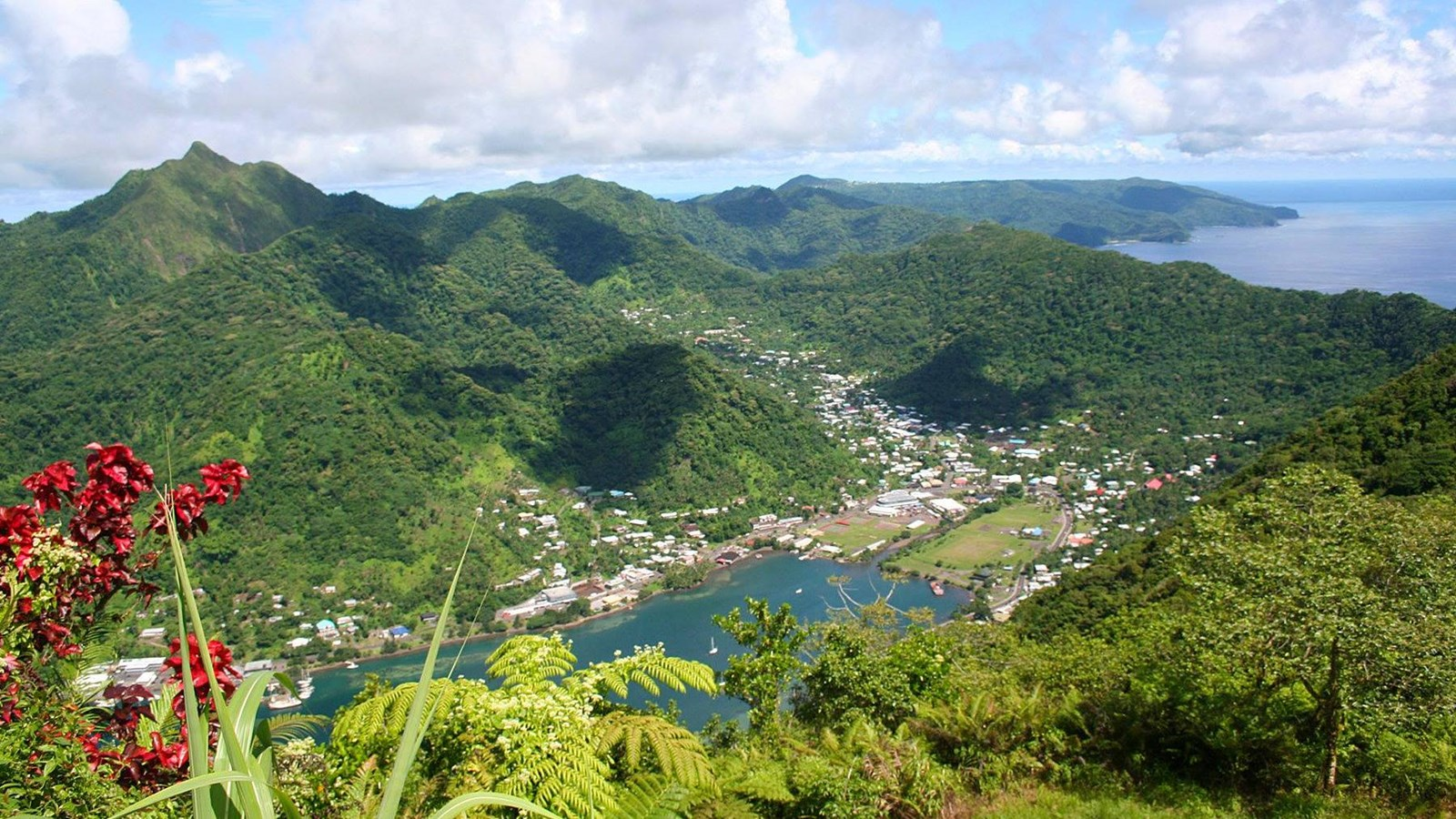
Mount 'Alava, on the island of Tutuila in American Samoa

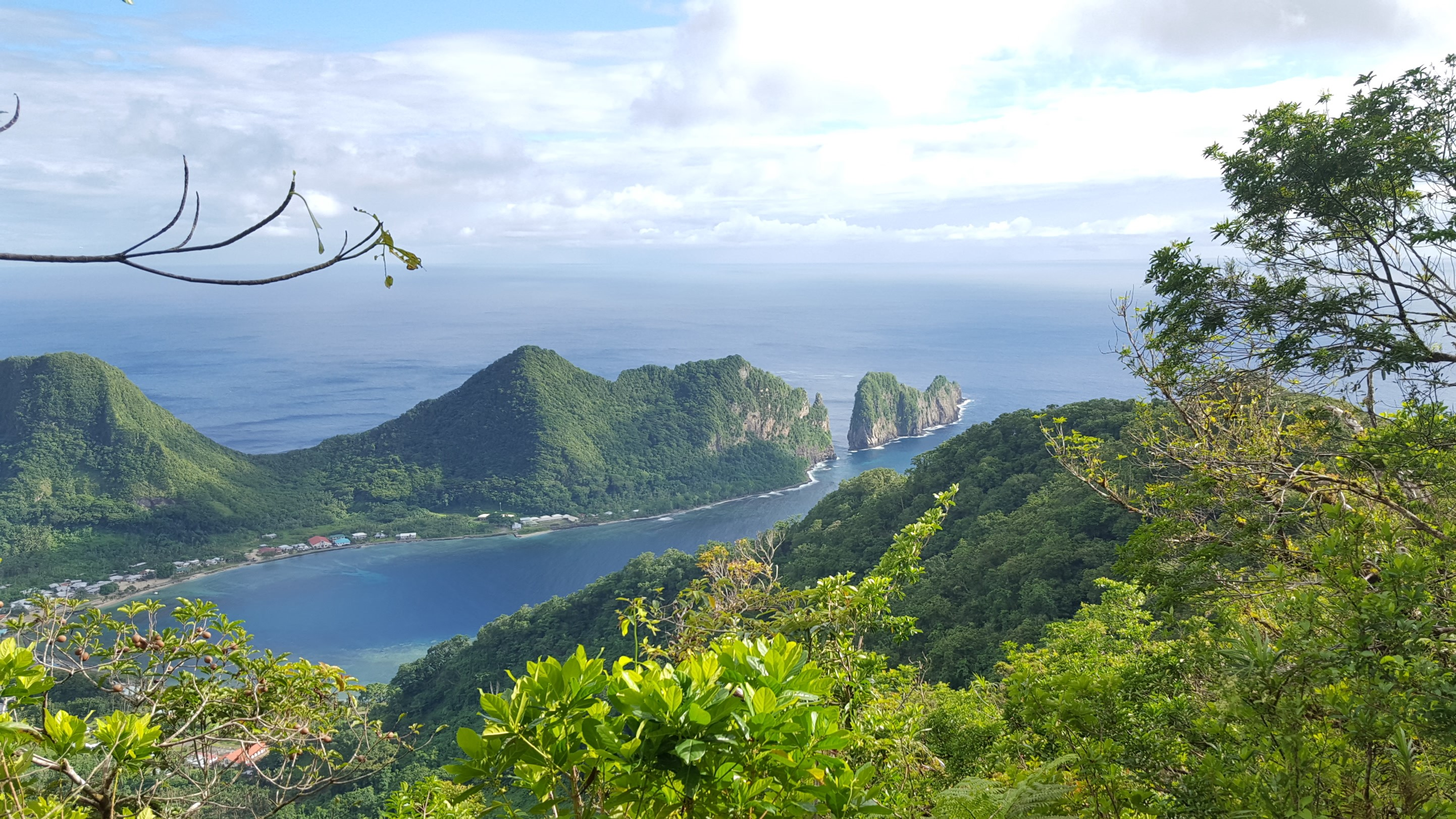
A view of Pola Island from the Mount Alava Adventure Trail

Mount ʻAlava is the second-highest mountain on Tutuila Island in American Samoa (after Mount Matafao). Its summit has an elevation of 491 meters (1,610 ft.). The summit of the mountain can be reached via the Mount Alava Trail. Also known by the name Mount Alava Adventure Trail, this steep route features 56 ladders and 783 steps. A broadcast station was established on Mount Alava in 1964.

From its summit, visitors are afforded expansive vistas over most of Tutuila Island; on clear days, the islands of Western Samoa and the Manu'a District are also visible. Access to the summit is provided by the Mount Alava Trailhead, situated at Fagasā Pass on the crest separating Fagasā and Vaipito Valley (Pago Pago). Originally a dirt road built for television transmitter access, the route has since been improved to accommodate hikers. The ascent is considered moderate and typically takes around three hours to complete.

Mount Alava has developed into a notable tourist attraction thanks to an observation platform that provides sweeping views of the island. Until recently, an aerial cable tramway — extending over a mile across Pago Pago Bay from the village of Utulei — offered direct access to this vantage point.

Mount ‘Alava is part of the caldera rim of the Pago Volcano.
