= Vaipito Valley =

Coordinates: 14°16′41″S 170°42′23″W

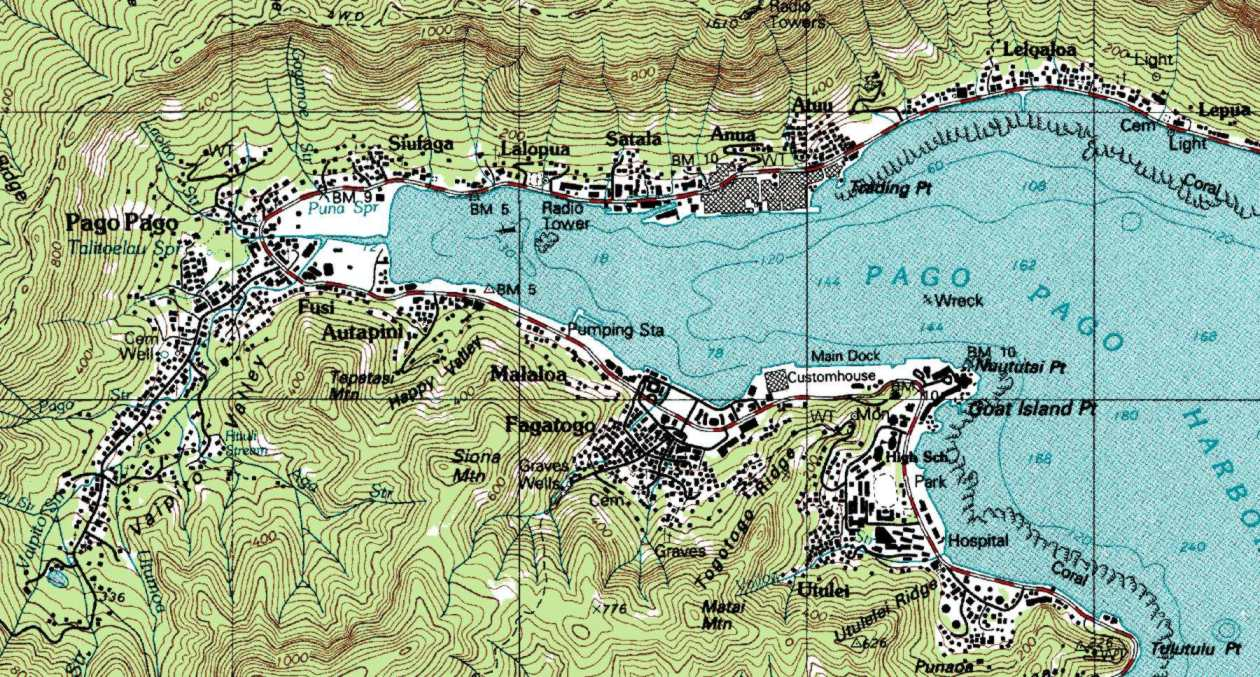
Map of Pago Pago.

Vaipito Valley is a valley in Pago Pago, American Samoa. Situated inland, the valley lies at the head of Pago Pago Harbor and follows the course of the Vaipito Stream, the main drainage system for the Pago Pago watershed. The valley rises to an elevation of approximately 600 feet, forming a natural low point in the surrounding mountain range, and serves as a primary residential area in Pago Pago village.

Vaipito Valley serves as the meeting point for three streams — the Vaipito Stream, Leau Stream, and Vaima Stream — which all flow into Pago Pago Harbor. The valley is framed by two mountains: Fatifati Mountain to the north, standing at 370 meters, and Palapalaloa Mountain to the south, reaching an elevation of 470 meters.

== Description ==
The valley holds considerable historical importance due to evidence of ancient Samoan Plainware pottery, a type of clay pottery dating back over 1,500 years. Artifacts, such as open, plain-design bowls with rounded bases, have been uncovered at various sites in Vaipito Valley, where the pottery fragments are believed to have been discarded. These ceramic finds are dated between 350 BCE and 10 CE. In addition to pottery, Vaipito Valley has revealed structural elements like rock foundations and terraces, known locally as lau mafola, which are believed to be remnants of early house sites.

The Vaipito Stream, a 1.7-mile (2.7-kilometer) waterway, flows through the valley and converges with Laolao Stream near Pago Pago Park before discharging into Pago Pago Harbor. This water network supports the local ecosystem and plays a significant role in the valley’s drainage system. A paved road off Route One near Spenser's Store allows access through the valley, leading up a ridge and across to Fagasā, which is a northern coastal village.

== Recreation ==
The village of Fagasā is located immediately over the Fagasā Pass from the Vaipito Valley. At Fagasā Pass, hikers can access trailheads for Mount ʻAlava on the north side of the road and Mount Matafao on the south side. The Mount ʻAlava Trail also descends to the village of Vatia. The Mount ʻAlava Trail is the only hiking trail in the Pago Pago section of the National Park of American Samoa.
