= Kingman Reef =

US reef in the North Pacific Ocean

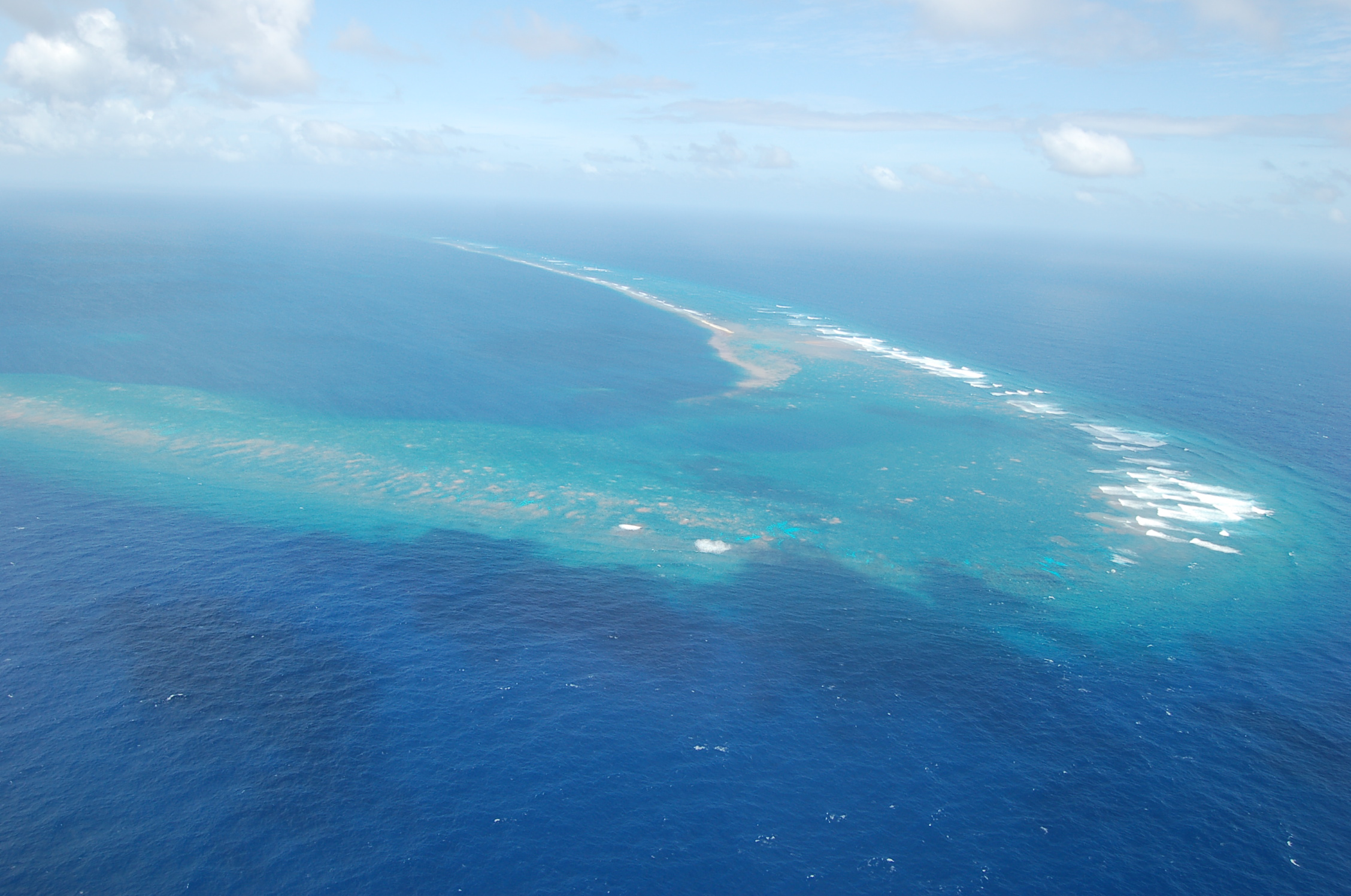
- Southeast part of Kingman Reef, looking north

- Location in Oceania Kingman Reef (Pacific Ocean)

Geography
- Location: Oceania
- Coordinates: 6°23′N 162°25′W
- Total islands: 2
- Area: 0.03 km^{2} (0.012 sq mi) (Land area – not including the lagoon)
- Length: 17 km (10.6 mi)
- Width: 8 km (5 mi)

Administration
- United States

Demographics
- Population: 0 (2016)

Additional information
- Time zone: Samoa Time Zone (UTC-11:00)

Kingman Reef (/ˈkɪŋmən/) is a largely submerged, uninhabited, triangle-shaped reef, geologically an atoll, 9.0 nmi (20 km) east-west and 4.5 nmi (8 km) north-south, in the North Pacific Ocean, roughly halfway between the Hawaiian Islands and American Samoa. It has an area of 3 hectares (0.03 km^{2}; 7.4 acres) and is an unincorporated territory of the United States in Oceania. The reef is administered by the United States Fish and Wildlife Service as the Kingman Reef National Wildlife Refuge. It was claimed by the United States in 1859 and later used briefly as a stopover for commercial Pacific flying boat routes in the 1930s going to New Zealand; however, the route was changed with a different stopover. It was administered by the Navy from 1934 to 2000 and thereafter by the Fish and Wildlife Service. It has since become a marine protected area. In the 19th century, it was noted as a maritime hazard, earning the name Hazard Rocks, and is known to have been hit once in 1876. In the 21st century, it has been noted for its marine biodiversity and remote nature. Hundreds of fish and coral species are on and around the reef.

== History ==
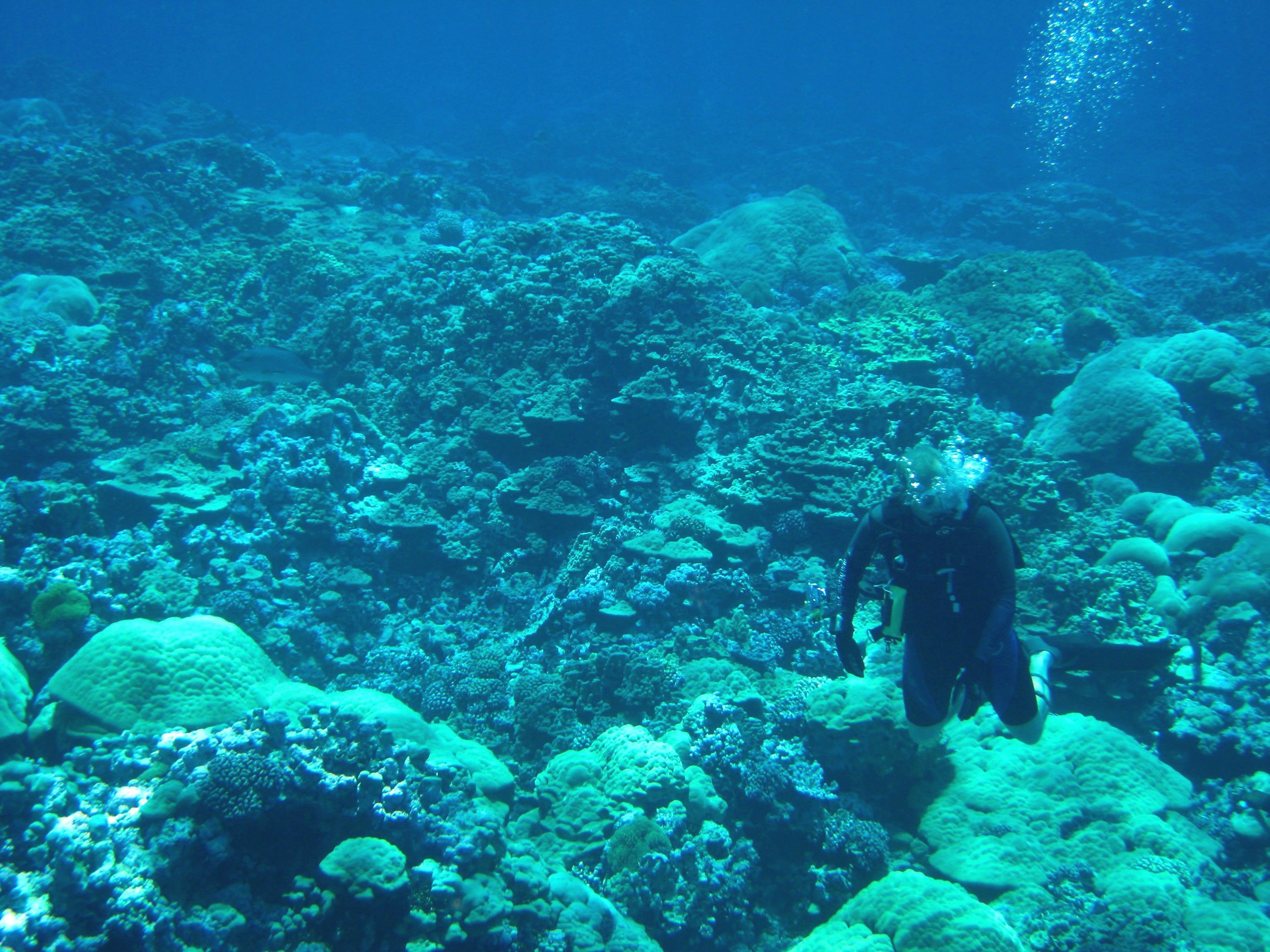
Scuba diver explores corals at Kingman Reef

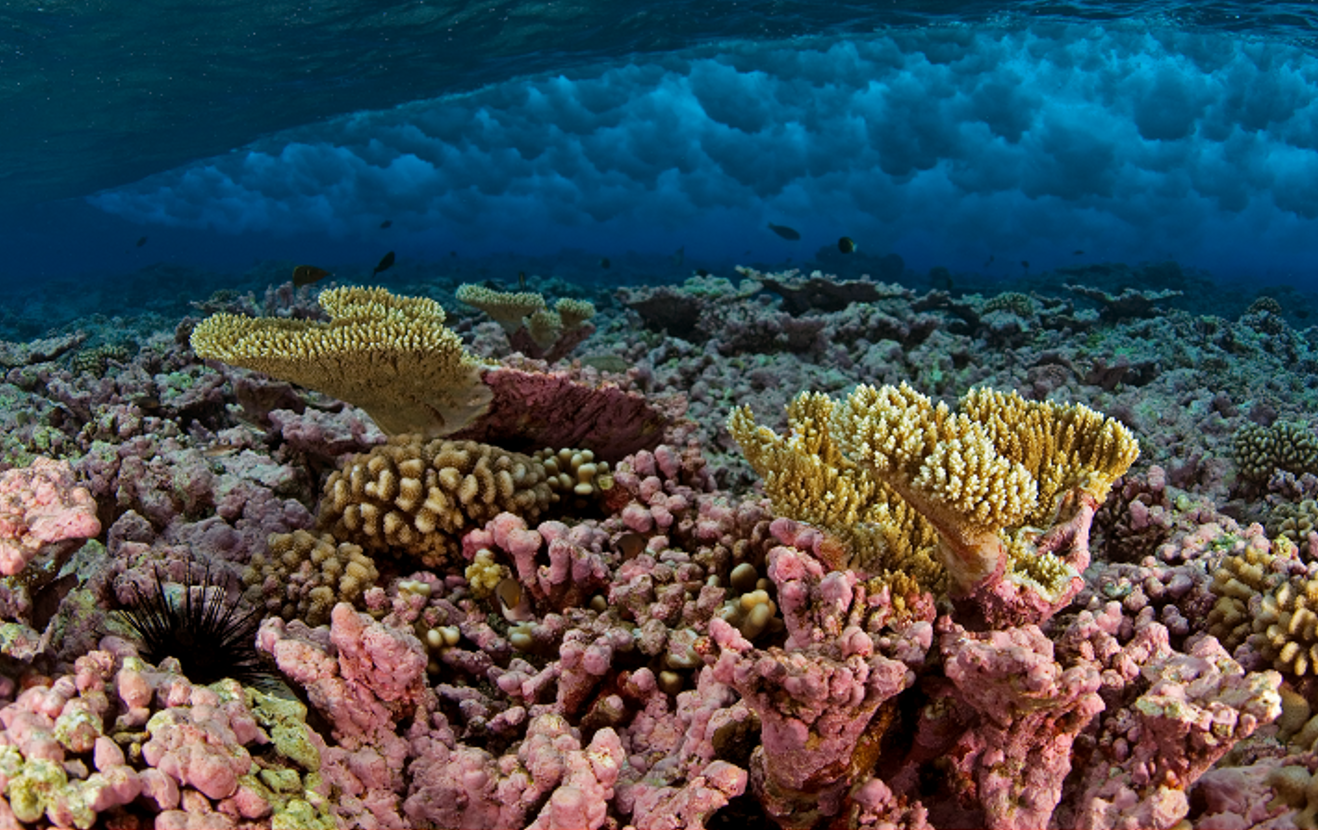
The shallow reef with wave breaking overhead

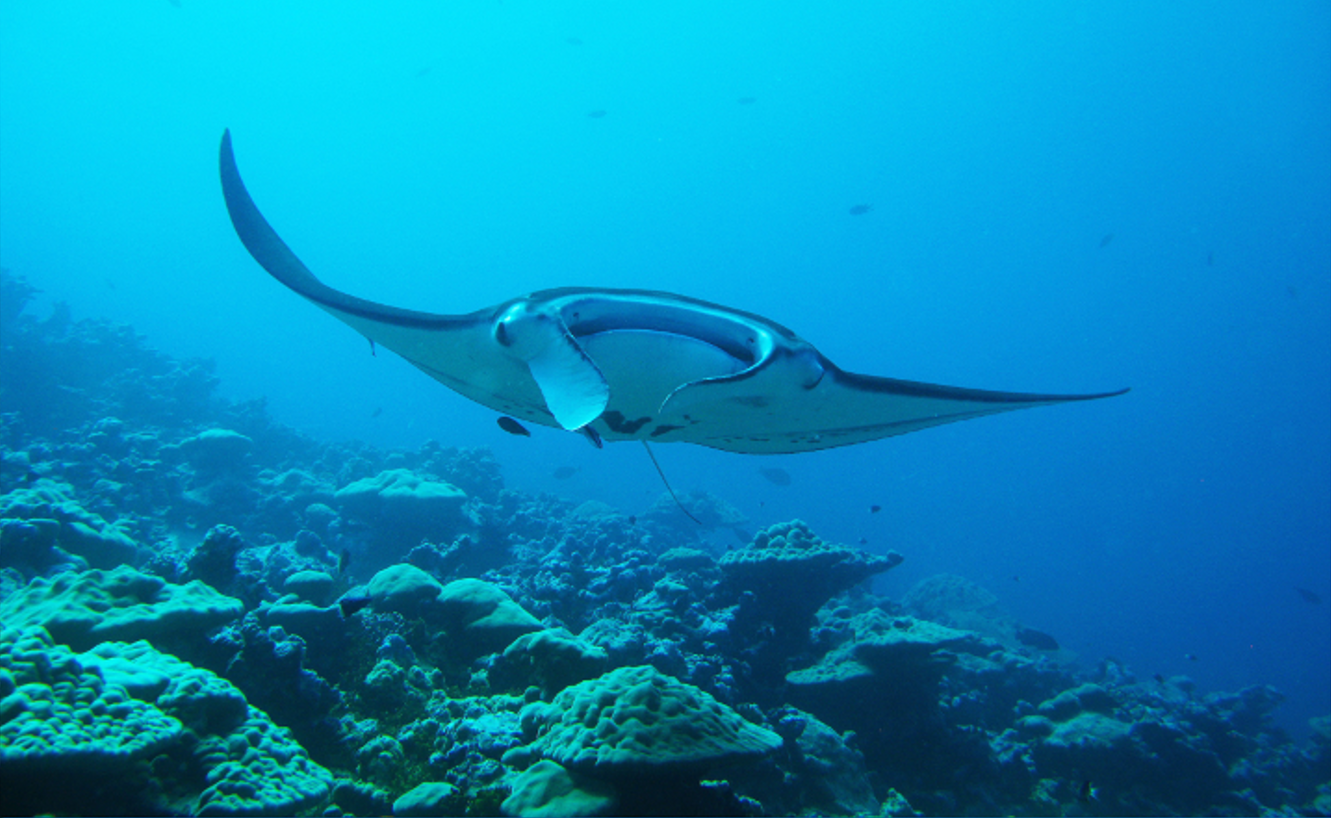
The edge of reef as a slope down to the depths of 30 to 40 degrees

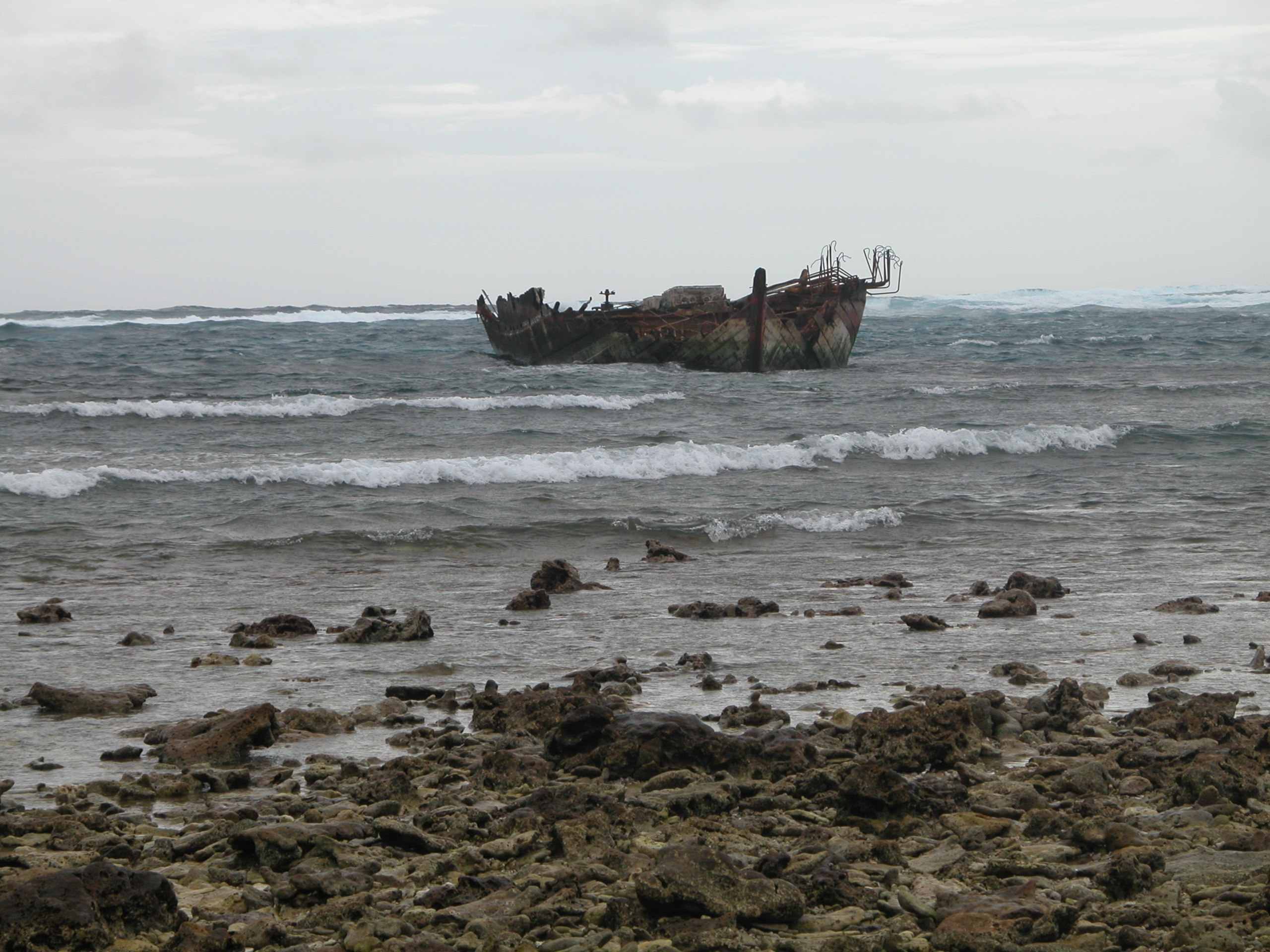
A derelict shipwreck at Kingman Reef

Kingman Reef was discovered on June 14, 1798, by the American captain Edmund Fanning of the ship Betsey. It was first described by Captain W. E. Kingman (whose name the island bears) of the ship Shooting Star on November 29, 1853. It was claimed in 1859 by the United States Guano Company, under the name "Dangers Rock," along with several other islands. The claim was made under the U.S. Guano Islands Act of 1856, although there is no evidence that guano existed or was ever mined on Kingman Reef. The British steamship Tarta struck the reef in June 1874, and it was later surveyed by HMS Penguin (1876) in 1897, establishing that Kingman Reef was the same hazard previously charted as Caldew Reef and Maria Shoal, among other names.

On May 10, 1922, Lorrin A. Thurston became the first person to raise the American flag on the atoll and read an annexation proclamation. The Palmyra Copra Co. intended to use Kingman as a fishing base, as demand for copra had declined after World War I and Palmyra Island lacked a suitable anchorage. Thurston formally claimed Kingman for the United States by reading the following declaration while standing on its shore:

Be it known to all people: That on the tenth of May, A.D. 1922, the undersigned agent of the Island of Palmyra Copra Co., Ltd., landed from the motorship Palmyra doth, on this tenth day of May, A.D. 1922, take formal possession of this island, called Kingman Reef, situated in longitude 162 degrees 18' west and 6 degrees 23' north, on behalf of the United States of America and claim the same for said company.

A copy of the declaration, along with a U.S. flag and clippings from The Honolulu Advertiser newspaper, were left on Kingman to document the claim.

On December 29, 1934, the U.S. Navy assumed jurisdiction over Kingman Reef. In 1935, the reef was visited by William T. Miller, representing the U.S. Bureau of Air Commerce.

In 1935, Pan American Airways wanted to expand its routes to the Pacific and include Australia and New Zealand in its "Clipper" air routes, with a stopover in Pago Pago, American Samoa. However, an additional stopover point was sought. It had been decided that the Kingman Reef lagoon, located 1,600 miles (2,600 km) north of Samoa, would be suitable for overnight stops for planes en route from the U.S. to New Zealand. A supply ship, the North Wind, was stationed at Kingman Reef to provide fuel, lodging, and meals. On March 23, 1937, the S42B Pan American Clipper II, named Samoan Clipper and piloted by Captain Ed Musick, en route from Hawaii to American Samoa, became the first flight to land in Kingman Reef's lagoon.

During the next several months, Pan Am successfully used the lagoon several times as a halfway station for its flying boats (Sikorsky S-42B) when they traveled between those two points. However, a Clipper flight on January 11, 1938, ended in tragedy. Shortly after the early-morning takeoff from Pago Pago, as it was bound for New Zealand, the plane exploded. The right outboard engine had developed an oil leak, and the aircraft burst into flames while dumping fuel; there were no survivors. As a result of the tragedy, Pan Am ended flights to New Zealand via Kingman Reef and Pago Pago. It established a new route in July 1940 that used Canton Island and New Caledonia as stopovers instead.

On February 14, 1941, President Franklin D. Roosevelt issued Executive Order 8682 to create naval defense areas in the central Pacific territories. The proclamation established the "Kingman Reef Naval Defensive Sea Area", encompassing the territorial waters between the extreme high-water marks and the three-mile marine boundaries surrounding the atoll. "Kingman Naval Airspace Reservation" was also established to restrict access to the airspace over the naval defense sea area. Only U.S. government ships and aircraft were permitted to enter the naval defense areas at Kingman Reef unless authorized by the Secretary of the Navy.

In 2012, Kingman Reef Atoll Development LLC, owned by descendants of the owners of the Palmyra Copra Co., Ltd., sued the U.S. government for its designation as a national wildlife refuge. The plaintiff sought $54.5 million in compensation for losing fishing rights, ecotourism, and other economic activity. However, in 2014, the federal court ruled that any such claim had expired by 1950 at the latest.

In 2016, the ARRL Awards Committee of the American Radio Relay League removed Kingman Reef from its DXCC list, with the reef now considered part of the Palmyra Island / Jarvis Island DXCC Entity.

== Geography ==
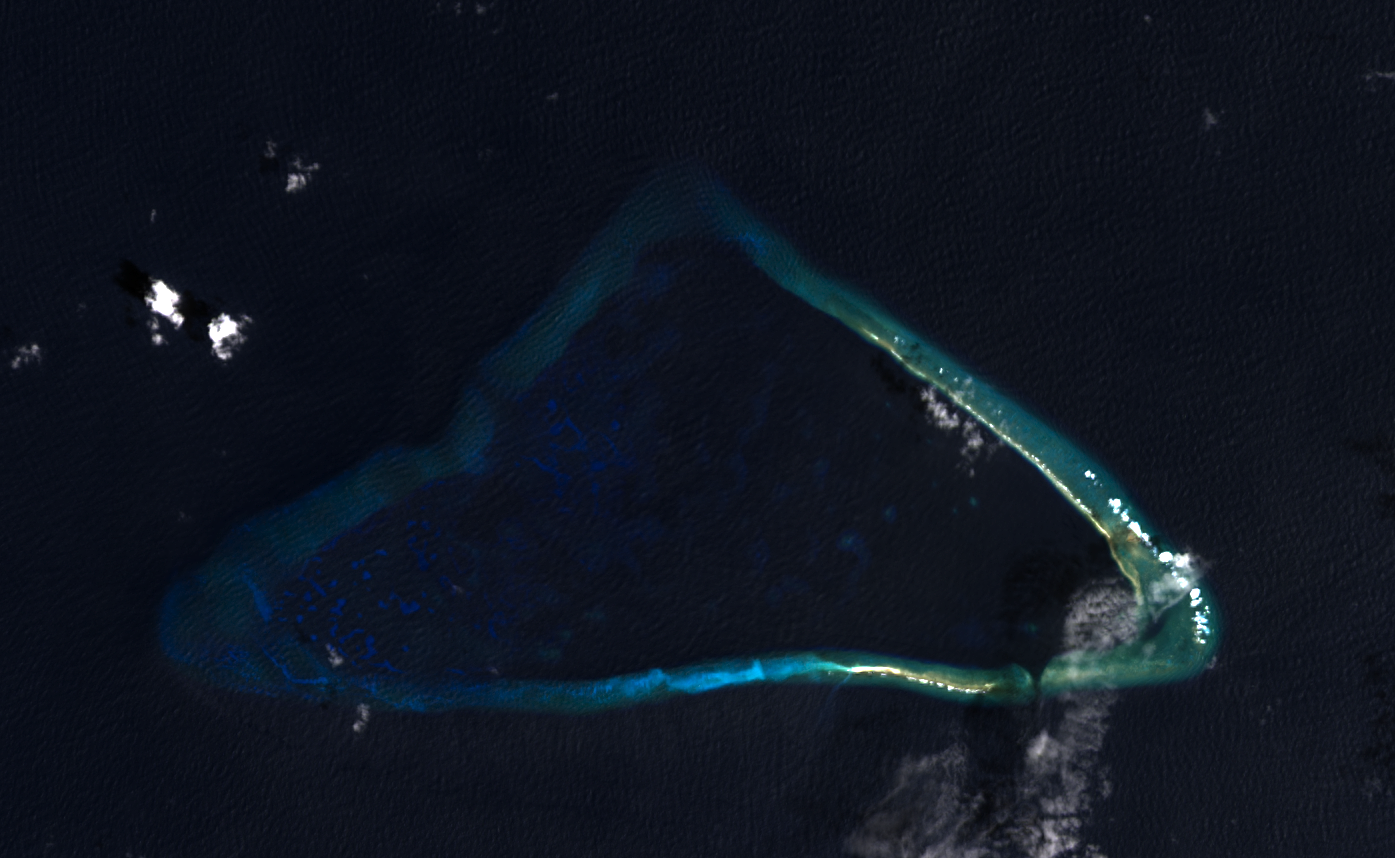
NASA Landsat 8 true-color photo of Kingman Reef

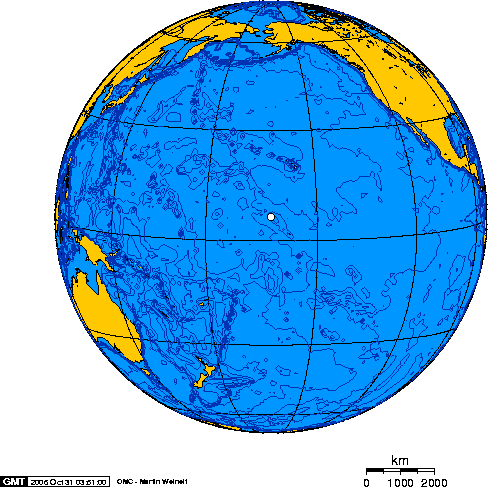
Orthographic projection over Kingman Reef

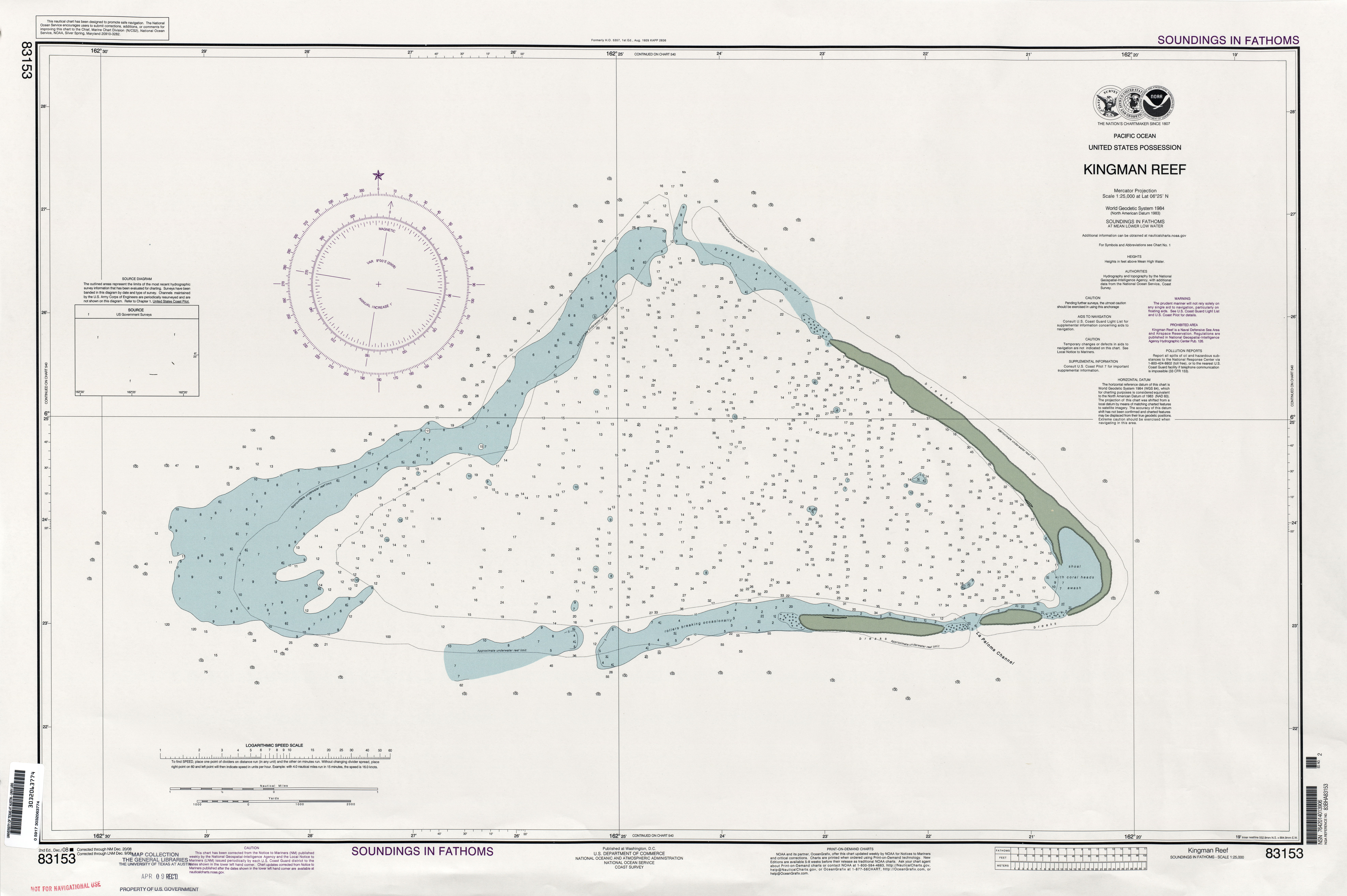
NOAA nautical chart of Kingman Reef

It is the northernmost of the Northern Line Islands and lies 36 nautical miles (67 km) northwest of the next closest island (Palmyra Atoll), and 930 nautical miles (1,720 km) south of Honolulu.

The reef encloses a lagoon up to 53 fathoms (318 ft; 97 m) deep in its eastern part near the northeastern spit of land. The total area within the outer rim of the reef is 20 sq nmi (70 km^{2}). There are two small strips (spits) of dry land composed of coral rubble and giant clamshells on the eastern rim with areas of 2 and 1 acre (0.8 and 0.4 ha) having a coastline of 2 miles (3 km), a short spit on the northeast side of the lagoon and a spit twice as long but thinner on its south side.

The highest point on the reef is less than 5 feet (1.5 m) above sea level, which is wet or awash most of the time, making Kingman Reef a maritime hazard. It has no natural resources and supports no economic activity.

== Political status ==
Kingman Reef has the status of an unincorporated territory of the United States, administered from Washington, D.C., by the U.S. Department of Interior. The atoll is closed to the public. For statistical purposes, Kingman Reef is grouped as part of the United States Minor Outlying Islands. In January 2009, Kingman Reef was designated a marine national monument.

The pre-20th century names Danger Rock, Caldew Reef, Maria Shoal, and Crane Shoal refer to this atoll, which was entirely submerged at high tide. Thomas Hale Streets described its state in the 1870s, when it had:

... hardly, as yet, assumed the distinctive features of an island. It is entirely under water at high tide, and but a few coral heads project here and there above the surface at low water. In the course of time, however, it will undoubtedly be added to the [northern Line Islands].

Kingman Reef is considered to be a county-equivalent by the U.S. Census Bureau. With only 0.01 square miles (0.03 square kilometers) of land, Kingman Reef is the smallest county or county-equivalent by land area in the United States.

== Ecology ==
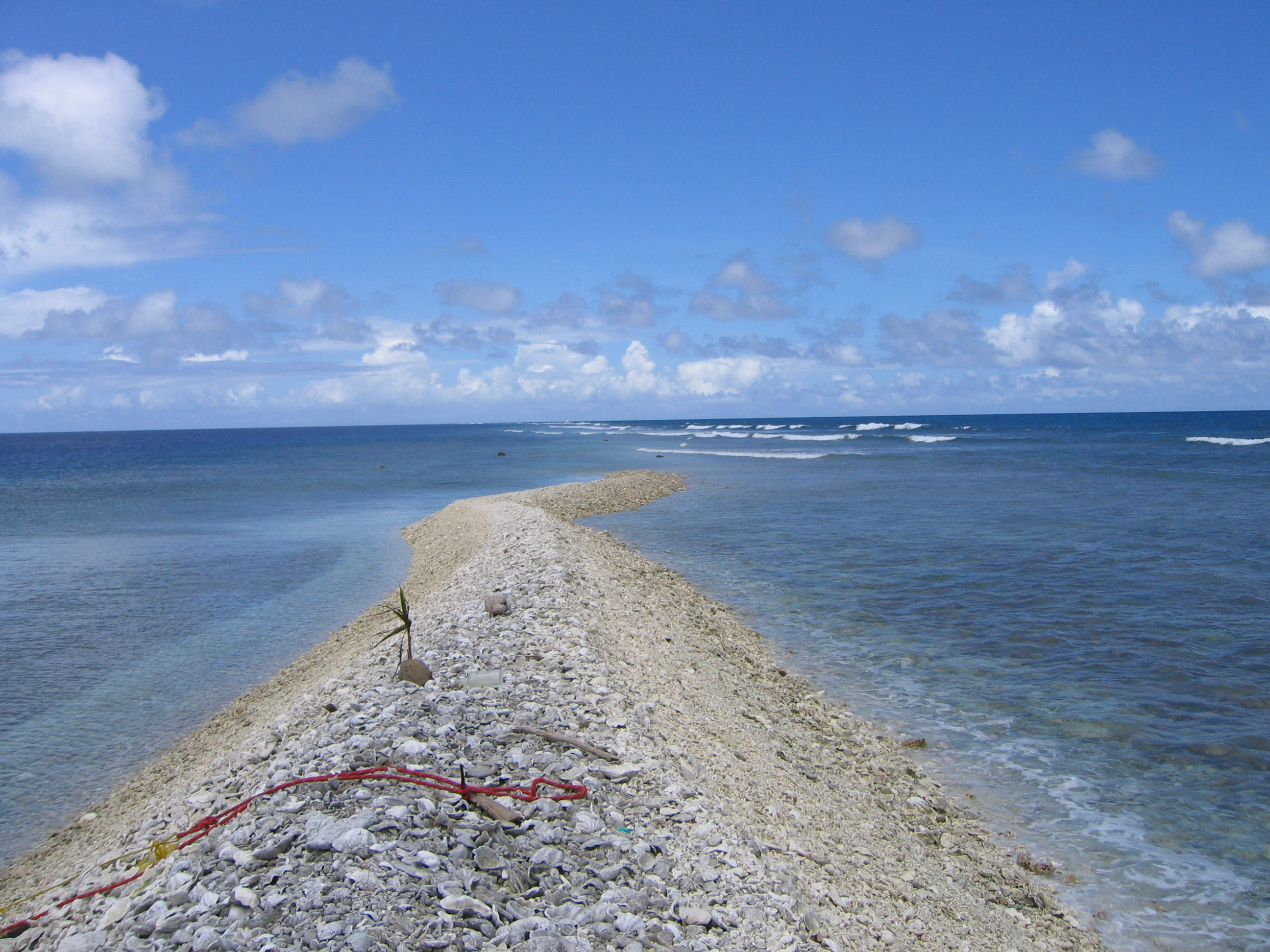
Dry strip of land on Kingman Reef with a coconut palm seedling; October 2003

Kingman Reef supports a vast variety of marine life. Giant clams are abundant in the shallows, and there are approximately 38 genera and 130 species of stony corals on the reef. This is more than three times the species diversity of corals in the main Hawaiian Islands. The ecosystem of the reef and its subsequent food chain is known for the distinct quality of being primarily predator-based. Sharks comprised 74% of the top predator biomass (329 g·m^{−2}) at Kingman Reef and 57% at Palmyra Atoll (97 g·m^{−2}). Low shark numbers have been observed at Tabuaeran and Kiritimati.

The percentage of the total fish biomass on the reef is made up of 85% apex predators, creating a high level of competition for food and nutrients among local organisms – particularly sharks, jacks, and other carnivores. The threatened green sea turtles that frequent nearby Palmyra Atoll travel to Kingman Reef to forage and bask on the coral rubble spits at low tide.

However, above sea level, the reef is usually barren of macroorganisms. Mainly constructed of dead and dried coral skeletons, providing only calcite as a source of nutrients, the small and narrow strips of dry land are only habitable by a handful of species for short periods. Most flora that begin to grow above water—primarily coconut palms—die out quickly due to the fierce tides and lack of resources necessary to sustain plant life.

== National Wildlife Refuge ==
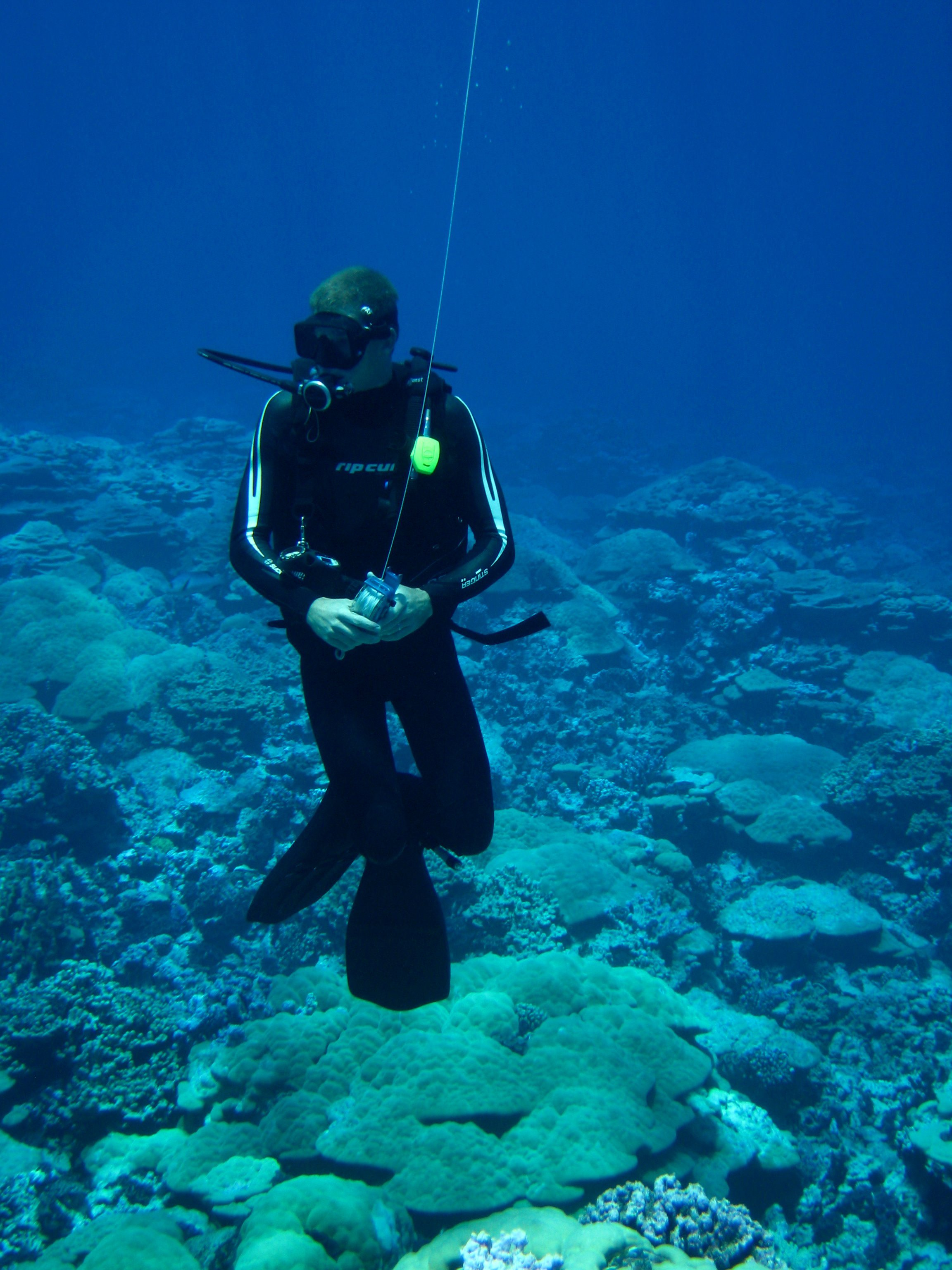
NOAA scuba diver studying the reefs in 2008

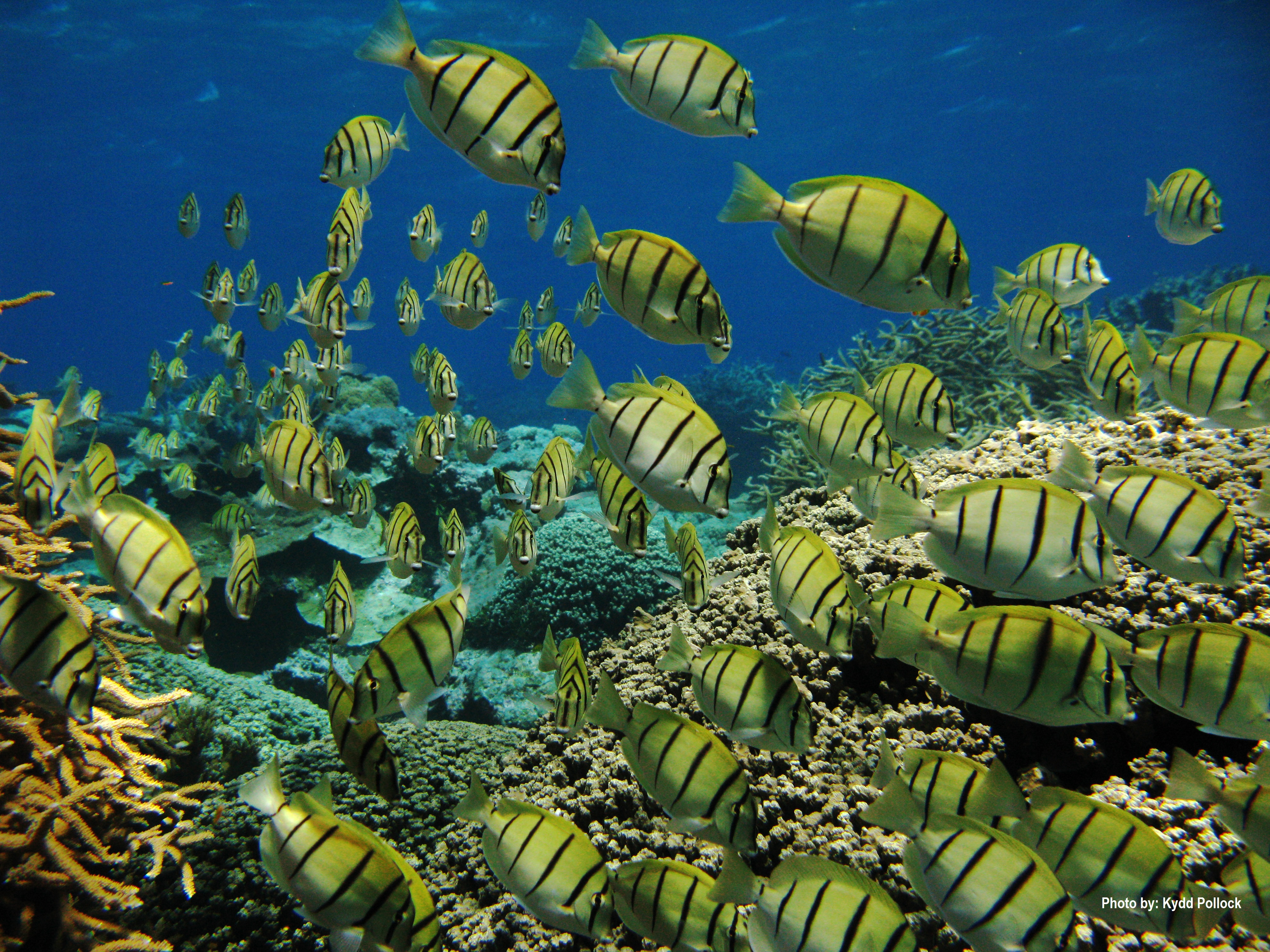
School of Manini fish at Kingman reef

On September 1, 2000, the Navy relinquished its control over Kingman Reef to the U.S. Fish and Wildlife Service. On January 18, 2001, Secretary of the Interior Bruce Babbitt created the Kingman Reef National Wildlife Refuge during his final days in office with Secretary's Order 3223. It is composed of the emergent coral rubble spits and all waters out to 12 nautical miles (22 km). While there are only 3 acres (0.012 km^{2}) of land, 483,754 acres (1,957.68 km^{2}) of water area is included in the Refuge. Along with six other islands, the reef was administered as part of the Pacific Remote Islands National Wildlife Refuge Complex. In January 2009, that entity was upgraded to the Pacific Remote Islands Marine National Monument by President George W. Bush. In 2025, this was renamed Pacific Islands Heritage Marine National Monument.

== Amateur radio expeditions ==
Since the early 1940s, Kingman Reef has had minimal human contact. However, amateur radio operators from around the world have occasionally visited the reef to put it "on the air" in what is known as a DX-pedition. In 1974, a group of amateurs using the callsign KP6KR sailed to the reef and set up a temporary radio station and antenna. Other groups visited the island in subsequent years, including 1977, 1980, 1981, 1988, and 1993.

More recently, 15 amateur radio operators from the Palmyra DX Group visited the reef in October 2000. Using the FCC-issued special event callsign K5K, the group made more than 80,000 individual contacts with amateurs worldwide for 10 days.

Between November 15, 1945, and March 28, 2016, Kingman Reef was considered a discrete entity to earn awards such as the DX Century Club. A video shot by amateur radio operators traveling to the K5P DX-pedition on Palmyra in January 2016 shows Kingman Reef mostly awash, raising questions as to whether a future activation of Kingman Reef would be possible.

On March 28, 2016, the ARRL DXCC desk deleted Kingman Reef from the list of collectible entities effective March 29, 2016, and deeming Kingman a part of the Palmyra and Jarvis entity due to proximity of the islands and common administration of the islands by the Fish and Wildlife Service. This makes QSL cards from the aforementioned expeditions irreplaceable.

== See also ==
- Dependent territory
- Insular area
- List of Guano Island claims
