= Zita Martel =

Samoan activist and archer

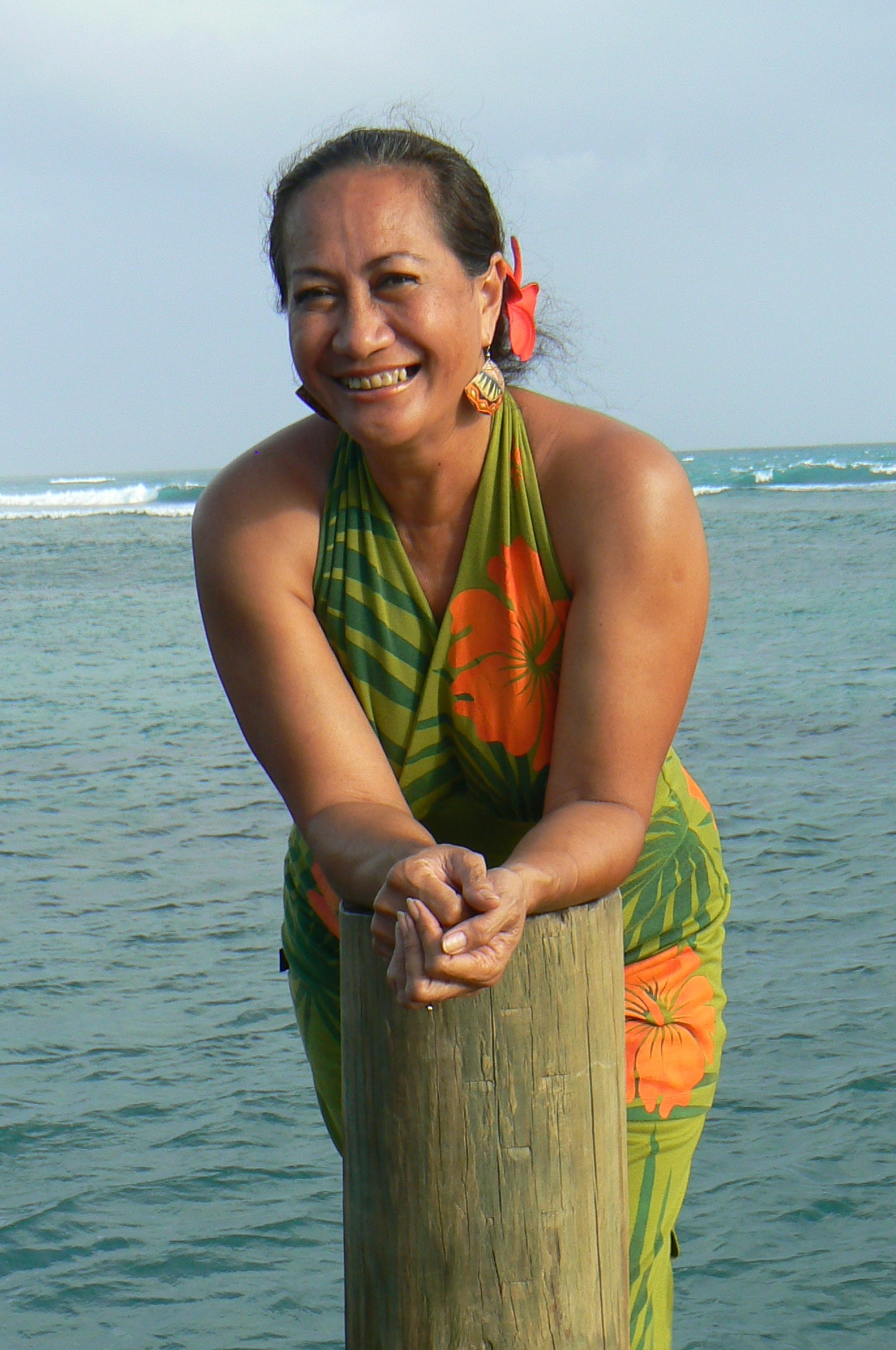
- Zita Martel in 2011.

Personal information
- Born: 15 July 1961 (age 64)

Sport
- Country: Samoa
- Sport: Archery
Medal record
Women's Archery
Representing Samoa
Pacific Games
Gold medal – first place	2011 Nouméa	compound matchplay
Bronze medal – third place	2011 Nouméa	compound
Silver medal – second place	2007 Apia	mixed team matchplay
Silver medal – second place	2007 Apia	compound

Vaimasenu'u Zita Sefo-Martel (born 15 July 1961) is a Samoan women's rights activist, fautasi skipper, and archer who has represented Samoa at the Pacific Games. She is also an honorary consul of France.

== Biography ==
Martel attended Canterbury University, where she had been a rower.

In 2000, her local church needed a skipper for their longboat, or fautasi. At first she refused the request, but was eventually persuaded to give it a try. When she became the skipper for her church, she also became the first woman to act as captain in the fautasi races in 2001. Her boat won the race at Samoa's 50th independence celebrations in 2012. In 2020 her crew won the Faleula to Apia fautasi race.

She represented Samoa in archery at the 2007 Pacific Games in Apia, winning silver (alongside Prime Minister Tuila'epa Sa'ilele Malielegaoi and Eddie Chan Pao) in the mixed recurve matchplay and in the individual compound. At the 2011 Pacific Games in Nouméa she won gold in the compound matchplay and bronze in the compound individual.

Martel also speaks out against domestic violence in Samoa.

== Honours ==
In 2013 Martel was made an officer of the French National Order of Merit.
