= Edwin Musick =

American pilot

Ed Musick
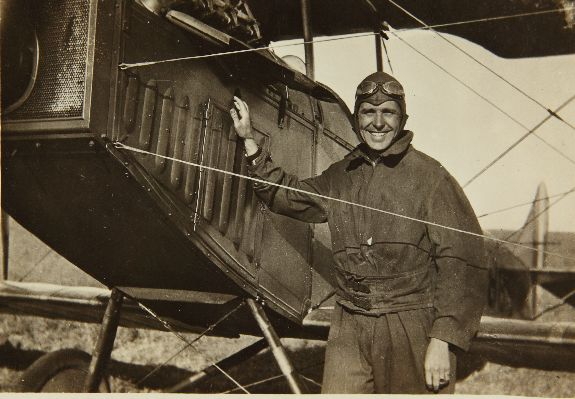
- Born: Edwin Charles Musick III; August 13, 1894; St. Louis, Missouri, US
- Died: January 11, 1938 (aged 43); Pago Pago, American Samoa
- Occupations: Chief pilot, Pan Am
- Years active: 1917–1938
- Known for: Surveying the trans-Pacific commercial air route

Signature
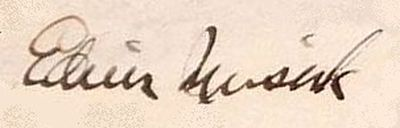

Edwin Charles Musick (August 13, 1894 – January 11, 1938) was chief pilot for Pan American World Airways and pioneered many of Pan Am's transoceanic routes including the famous route across the Pacific Ocean, ultimately reaching the Philippine Islands, on the China Clipper.

== Biography ==
Musick was born on August 13, 1894, in St. Louis, Missouri, where his father ran a hardware store. The family moved to California when Musick was 9, and he first took flight during boyhood experiments. Musick attended Los Angeles Poly for three years and continued for two years afterwards at night while working as an automobile mechanic. Musick would soon switch careers to become an aircraft mechanic in 1914 for the Glenn L. Martin Company.

In 1938, he and his wife (the former Cleo Livingston) were living in San Francisco; they had no children.

=== Career ===
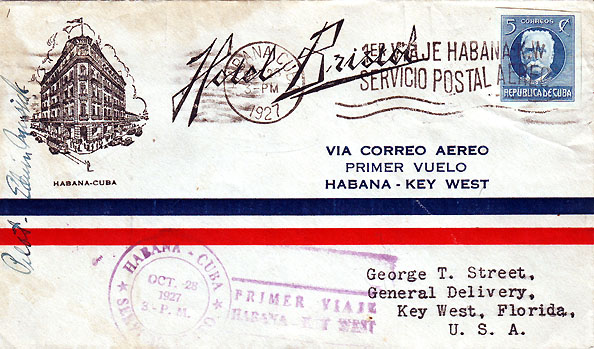
Cuban franked Air Mail cover flown and autographed by PAA Capt. Edwin Musick on the first northbound flight of FAM 4 from Havana to Key West, Florida. October 29, 1927

After attending an air show at Dominguez Field in January 1910, Musick, along with a couple of friends, built his first airplane in 1912; it reached an altitude of 9 feet (2.7 m) and promptly crashed. In 1913, he learned to fly aircraft at a flight school in Los Angeles and began flying as an exhibition pilot in 1915. In June 1917 he joined the Aviation Section, U.S. Signal Corps (later called the United States Army Air Service) in San Diego as a flight instructor for the duration of World War I, and was later transferred to airfields in Wichita Falls, Texas, and Miami, Florida. He then accepted a commission as a 2nd Lieutenant in the Marine Flying Corps on August 28, 1918, at Miami, Florida. After the war, he founded his own flying school in Florida and surpassed the 10,000 flying hours mark.

Musick also flew for several airlines starting in 1920–21: Aeromarine Airways, where he studied navigation, and Mitten Air Transport, shuttling between Philadelphia and Washington DC. In October 1927, Musick joined Pan American as it was just starting their operations. He made the company's inaugural mail flight to Havana, Cuba from Key West, Florida, on October 28 of that year. Musick was promoted to chief pilot for Pan American's Caribbean Division in 1930.

In 1934, Musick was chosen to make the trial flights for the new Sikorsky S-42 flying boat. During these stringent test flights, Musick collected 10 world records for seaplanes; one of the test flights was a non-stop flight of 1,250 miles (2,010 km).

=== Trans-Pacific Clipper flights ===
Musick's work on the trials with the Sikorsky S-42 led to him piloting the first two trans-Pacific survey routes for Pan American in 1935, laid out by Pan Am executives Juan Trippe, André Priester, and Charles Lindbergh and initially plotted by the chartered SS North Haven, which also carried prefabricated buildings, equipment, and supplies to establish air bases. The first survey flight from Alameda to Honolulu, landing at 10:21 am Pacific Standard Time on April 17, 1935, took 18 hours, 21 minutes, breaking a record held jointly by six Navy aircraft; the aircraft, named Pan American Clipper, carried a consignment of 10,000 letters, the first shipment of airmail to Hawaii. Flight time was extended by half an hour as the aircraft circled over Honolulu upon arrival, to the delight of onlookers. Musick commanded a six-man crew, which included navigator Fred Noonan.

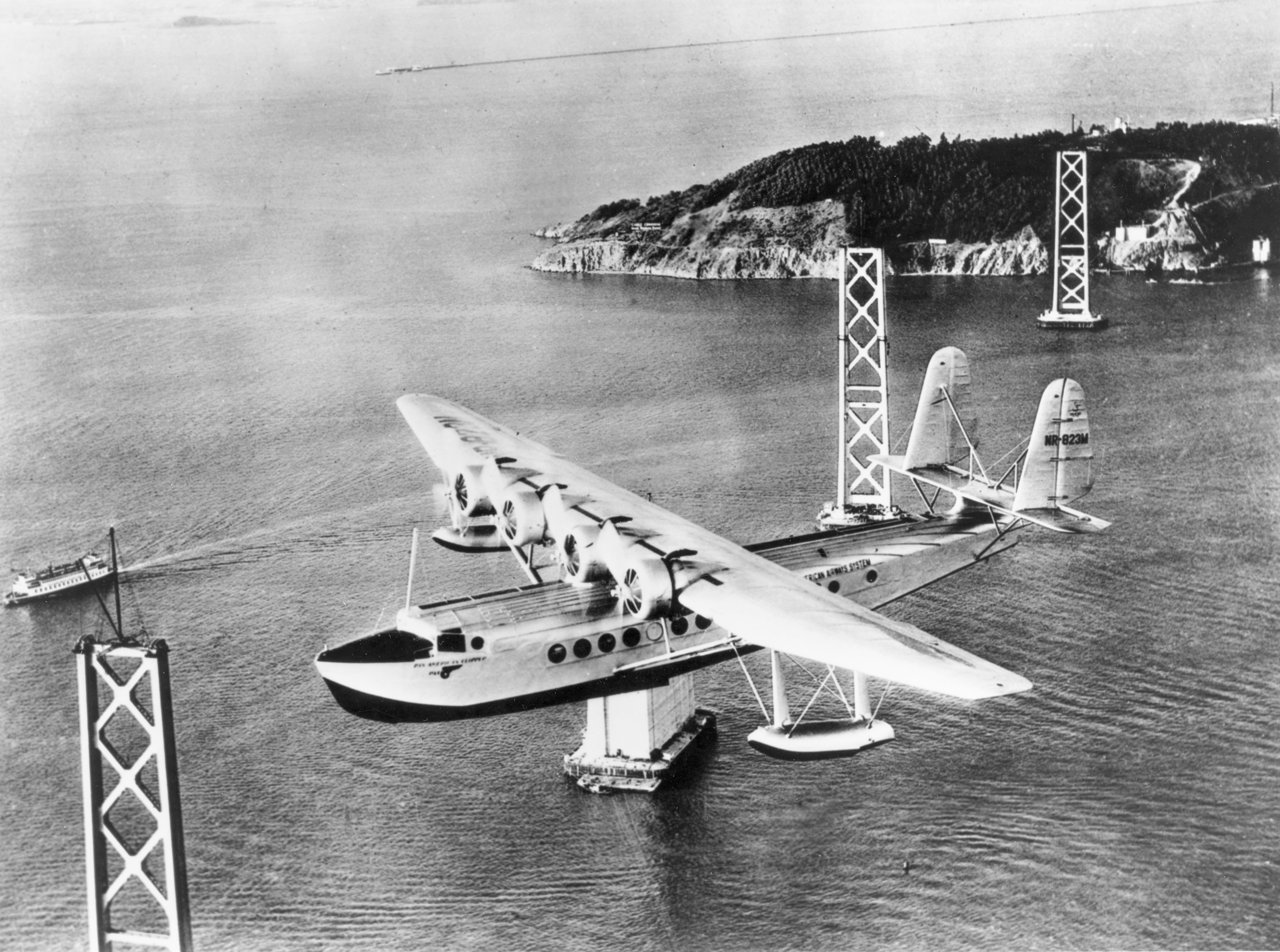
Pan American Clipper flying over the incomplete western suspension span of the San Francisco-Oakland Bay Bridge, c.1935

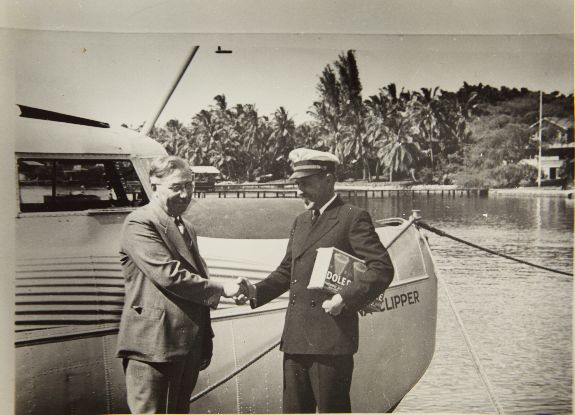
Musick shaking hands with a representative of the Dole Food Company in a publicity photograph staged by the nose of China Clipper (c. 1936)

The second survey flight departed Honolulu for Midway Atoll on June 15, 1935; the flight returned to Alameda on June 22. Later survey flights pushed the route to Wake Island, returning to Alameda on August 28, and Guam, returning on October 24. The Guam round-trip flight was commanded by R. O. D. Sullivan, Musick's first officer for the April flight.

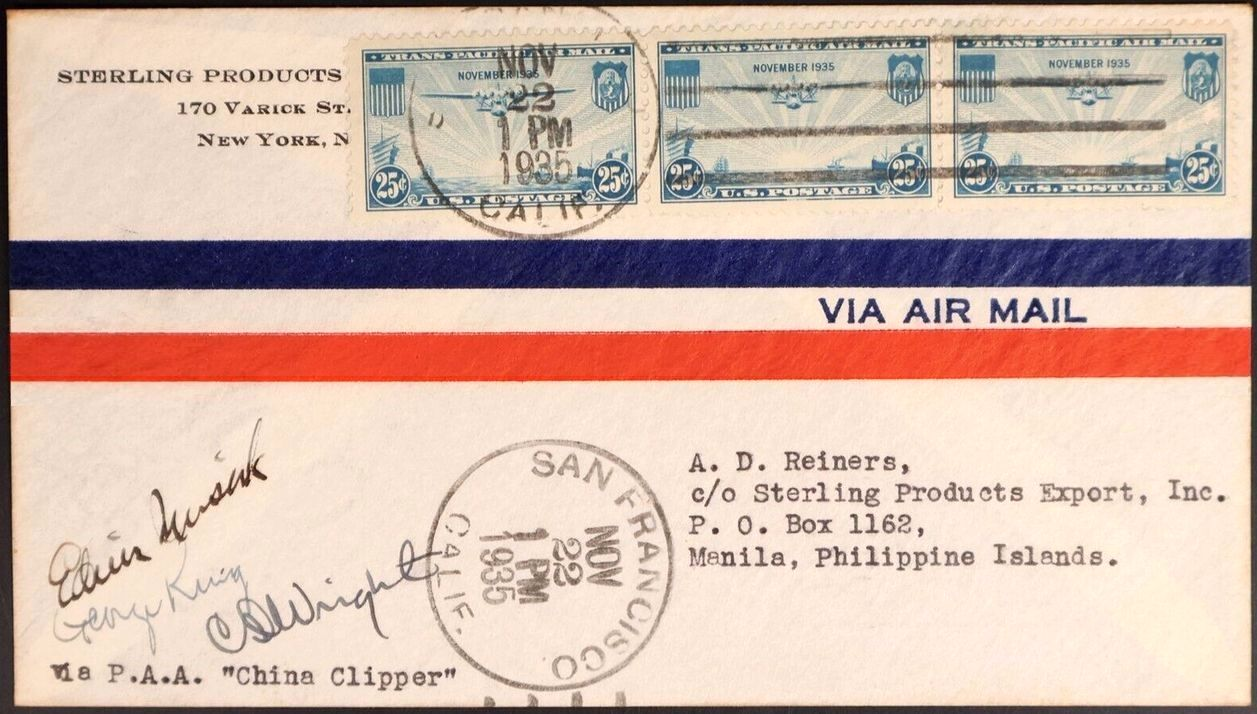
First flight cover flown aboard the China Clipper on its inaugural airmal flight across the Pacific Ocean. Signed by pilot Edwin Musick and crew members George King and C.D. Wright

Musick also commanded the first commercial trans-Pacific flight, carrying mail to the Philippines; the Martin M-130 China Clipper departed from Alameda on November 21, 1935, and landed in Manila on November 29, 6 days, 7 hours, and 40 minutes later, logging nearly 60 hours of flight time. The aircraft flew the trans-Pacific route surveyed in the four earlier flights, with stops in Honolulu, Midway, Wake, and Guam. Compared to the first survey flight, the initial leg to Honolulu was slowed by strong headwinds and arrived after 21 hours, 13 minutes of flight time. China Clipper returned to Alameda on December 6.

He was also responsible for surveying a route to New Zealand and Australia in 1937 via Hawaii, Kingman Reef, and American Samoa. The S-42B Pan American Clipper II had arrived in Honolulu for that flight on March 18, 1937, with one of the four engines stopped due to an oil leak, requiring several days to repair. Upon his arrival in Auckland on March 29, the famously terse Musick responded to the crowd of 30,000 who had turned out to greet the flight with the brief statement "We are glad to be here." On December 29, 1937, Musick, aboard the Samoan Clipper, made the first flight from New Zealand to the United States, an experimental and survey flight to Hawaii and then to San Francisco.

Because of his exploits with Pan American, Musick was one of the best known pilots of the 1930s, making the cover of Time magazine on December 2, 1935. He received the Harmon Trophy in 1936 to recognize the first commercial flight of China Clipper. At one point during the 1930s, Musick held more flying records than any other pilot. At the time of his death, Captain Musick had reportedly flown about two million transocean miles in airline service.

=== Final flight ===
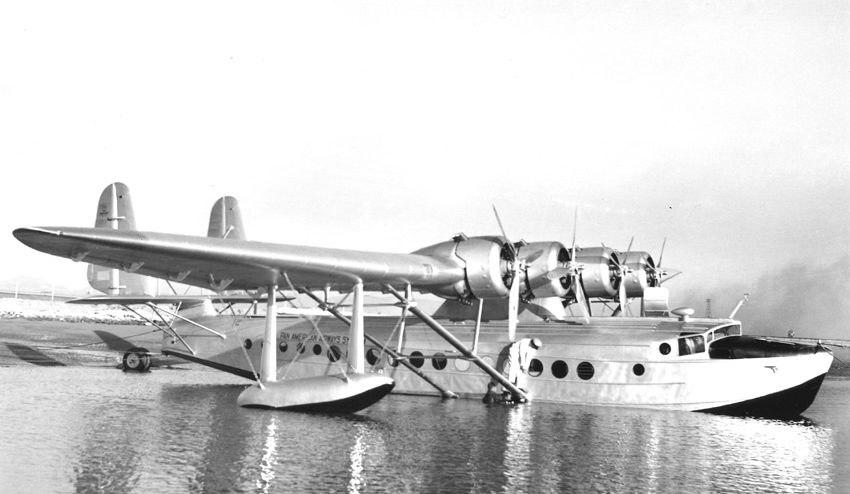
Samoan Clipper at Alameda (1937)

Musick and his crew of six died in the crash of the Sikorsky S-42 Samoan Clipper (ex-Pan American Clipper II) near Pago Pago, American Samoa, on a cargo and survey flight returning from Auckland, New Zealand. Approximately 38 minutes after take-off on January 11, 1938, the aircraft reported an engine oil leak and Musick turned back toward Pago Pago after securing that engine. Their anticipated time of return was 8:30 am local time (GMT-11).

The final radio transmission from the crew was that they were dumping fuel to lighten the aircraft in preparation for a precautionary landing at 8:27 am; shortly afterwards, an explosion tore the aircraft apart in flight. Unnamed Pan Am officials speculated at the time that the dump valves, located underneath the wing, may have vented vaporized fuel near the engines' exhaust ports, resulting in an explosion and loss of the flying boat.

Once the aircraft had missed its planned return time, a search was launched for the aircraft; floating debris surrounded by an oil slick was found approximately 12 hours later, approximately 14 miles (23 km) northwest of Pago Pago by the U.S. naval seaplane tender USS Avocet. Debris was limited to charred pieces of the aircraft and its equipment; a Pan American Airways officer's jacket, later identified as belonging to the radio officer, was also recovered. However, the bodies of the seven crewmen, Capt. Edwin C. Musick, First Officer Cecil Sellers, flight officer Paul S. Brunk, navigation officer Frederick J. MacLean, radio officer Thomas D. Finley, flight engineer John W. Stickrod, and mechanic John A. Brooks were never recovered. All that remained at the scene of the crash were scorched fragments of wood and metal and some papers from the logbook floating about the surface.

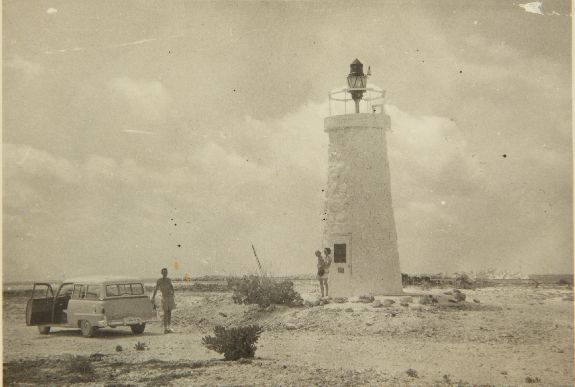
Musick Light on Kanton Island

After the crash, Pan Am abandoned plans for a base at Pago Pago and instead built a refueling station at Kanton Island, one of the Phoenix Islands in Kiribati, completing construction in July 1939. The alternate route was enabled by the arrival of the Boeing 314 Clippers, which had a longer range than the prior S-42 and M-130 Clippers.

== Legacy ==
Musick Light, a lighthouse on Kanton Island, was the first structure to be dedicated to Musick in July 1938. Musick Point in Auckland Harbour was also named after him in 1942. During World War II, a Liberty ship was christened SS Edwin C. Musick on February 11, 1944. Musick Road at the Honolulu Airport was named in his honor.

In 2019, the Air/Sea Heritage Foundation launched a search for the wreck of Samoan Clipper in collaboration with Search, Inc. and Ocean Exploration Trust. The search, conducted from E/V Nautilus, concluded on July 20 with nothing found.

== See also ==
- Glenn Curtiss, (1878 –1930) Pioneer aviator, developer of the first seaplanes used by the U.S. Navy
