= Sikorsky S-42 =

Flying boat in the US

S-42
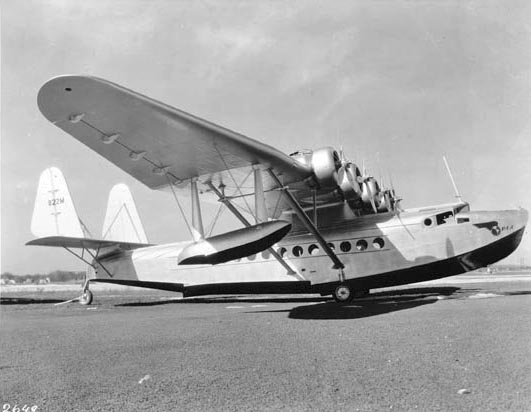
- S42 NC-822M, "Brazilian Clipper", 1934

General information
- Type: Flying boat airliner
- National origin: United States
- Manufacturer: Sikorsky Aircraft
- Designer: Igor Sikorsky
- Status: Retired, none remaining
- Primary user: Pan American Airways
- Number built: 10

History
- Introduction date: 1934
- First flight: March 29, 1934 (prototype)
- Developed from: Sikorsky S-40

The Sikorsky S-42 was a commercial flying boat designed and built by Sikorsky Aircraft to meet requirements for a long-range flying boat laid out by Pan American World Airways (Pan Am) in 1931. The design featured wing flaps, variable-pitch propellers, and a full-length hull that supported the tail directly. The prototype first flew on 29 March 1934, and set ten world records for payload-to-height. The "Flying Clipper" and the "Pan Am Clipper" were other names for the S-42.

== Design and development ==
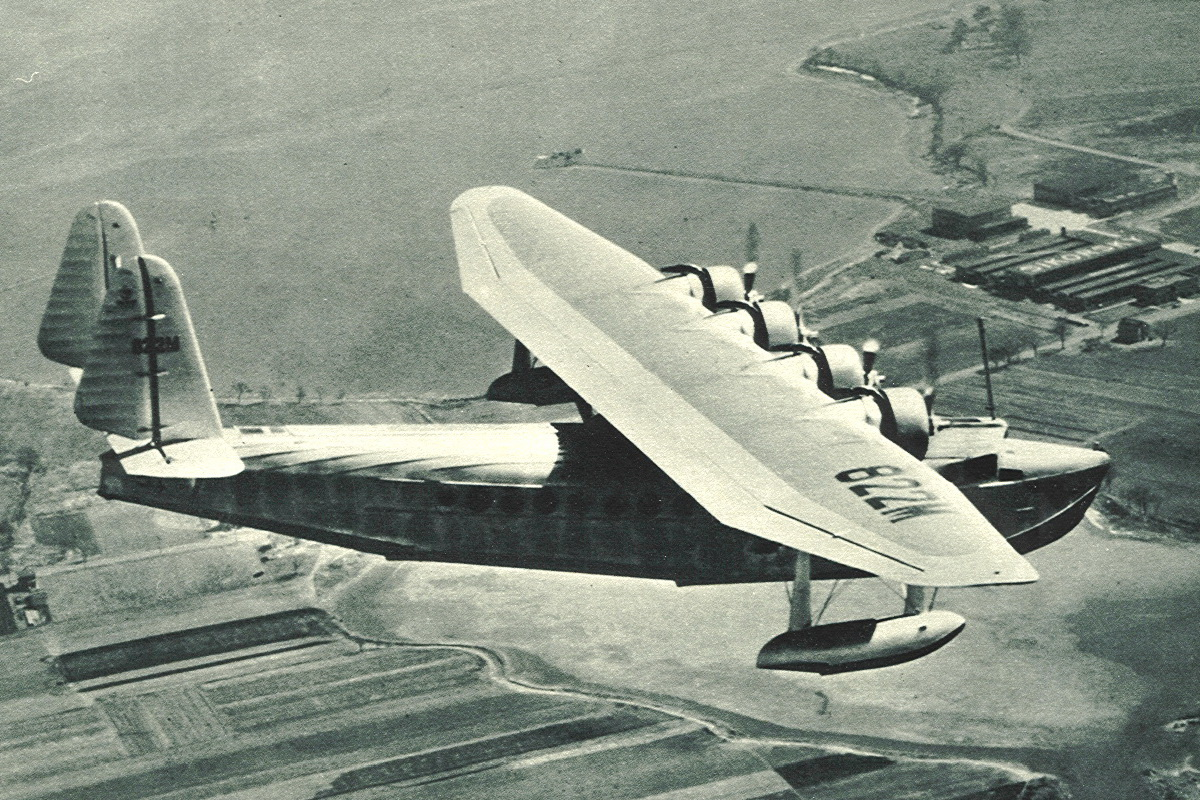
Sikorsky S-42, aircraft registration NC-822M, "Brazilian Clipper", Pan American Airways, 1934

During the inaugural flight of Sikorsky's previous flying boat, the S-40, on November 19, 1931, the pilot and Pan American Airways consultant, Charles Lindbergh, who considered the S-40 a monstrosity, engaged designer Igor Sikorsky in a conversation about what he thought the next airplane should look like. Sikorsky argued that design development should be incremental and that the safe approach would be a larger S-40. Lindbergh argued that a low drag design, with a range in still air of 2,500 mi (4,000 km), was needed.

In June 1931 Pan Am president Juan Trippe had requested designs from six aircraft companies for an aircraft able to span the oceans. The new design would need increased lifting capacity to carry enough fuel and 300 lb (140 kg) of mail, but no passengers, for a 2,500 mi (4,000 km) nonstop flight against a 30 mph (50 km/h) headwind, at a higher cruising speed than the norm for similar flying boats at that time. Of the six companies tenders had been sent to, only Sikorsky and Martin provided submissions. Sikorsky offered the S-42. The other offer was the more ambitious Martin M-130.

The new Sikorsky design, the S-42, had major aerodynamic improvements over the S-40. Igor Sikorsky said, "in its very outline the S-42 represents simplicity. Diverting sharply from the past Sikorsky designs, external bracings have been reduced to a minimum. The tail, instead of being supported by outriggers, is attached directly to the hull." The S-42 had a high wing loading which required flaps to provide acceptable takeoff and landing speeds. Though Lindbergh approved of the S-42, it fell far short of his proposed range. Stripped of all accommodations, with extra fuel tanks in the fuselage, the S-42 was just able to fly proving flights across the Atlantic and Pacific oceans. Pan Am would have to wait for the Martin M-130 to have an airliner capable of flying the Pacific with a payload.

Pan Am's S-42s were used primarily on the Miami - Rio de Janeiro route. In 1937 S-42s also operated a New York-to-Bermuda service. 1940 saw S-42 flights between Seattle and Alaska. An S-42 was also used between Manila and Hong Kong.

British Marine Aircraft Ltd. was formed in February 1936 to produce S-42A flying boats under license in the United Kingdom but nothing came of this. The company built a factory on the western side of the Hamble peninsula with a slipway to Southampton Water. When the deal fell through, the company was sold to Henry Folland, who renamed it Folland Aircraft Limited.

== Operational history ==
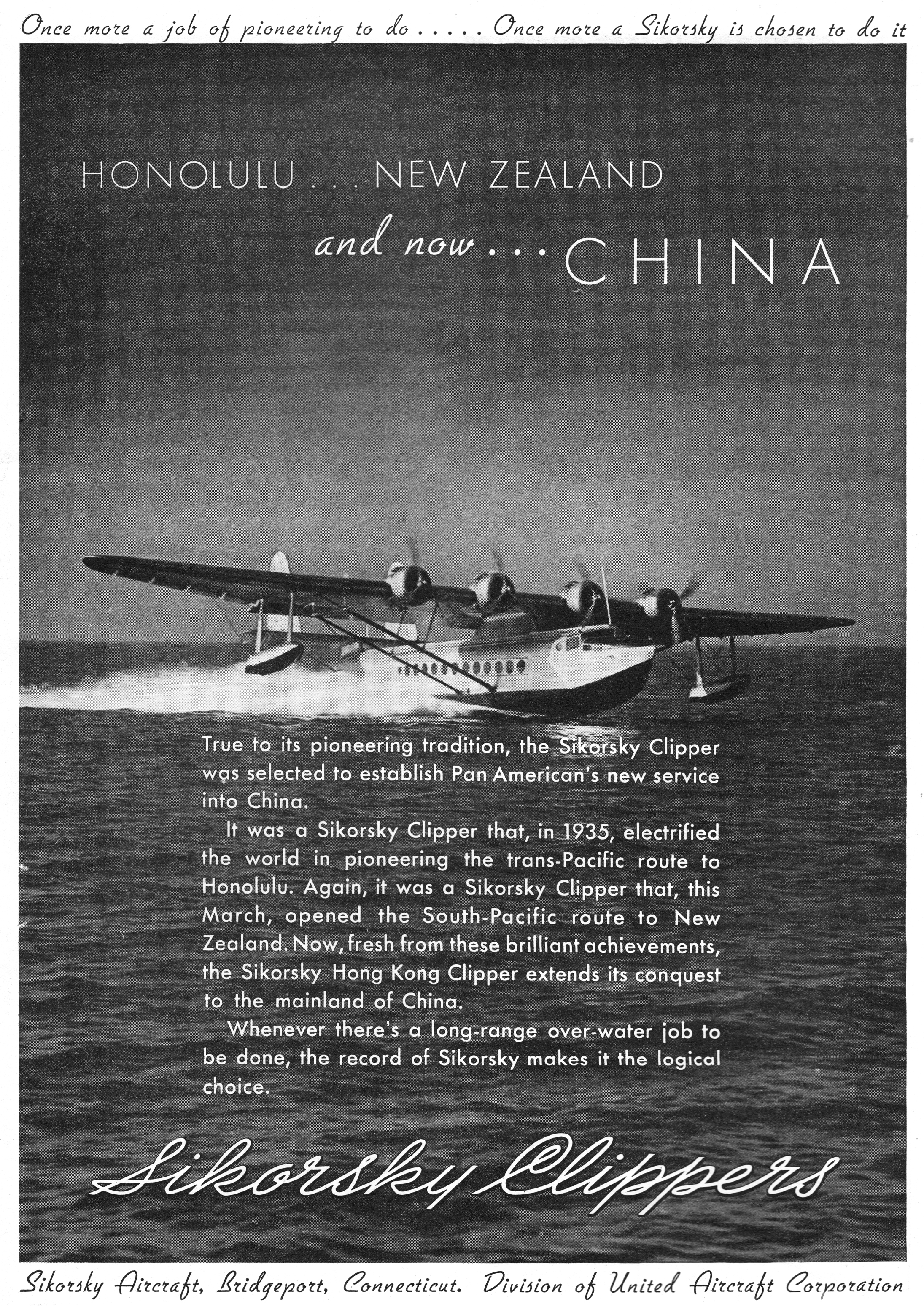
1937 ad for S-42 Clipper

Flying for Pan American Airways, a total of ten S-42s were built, manufactured by the Vought-Sikorsky Aircraft Division of the United Aircraft Corporation in Stratford, Connecticut. The prototype first flew on March 30, 1934.

Pan American was the sole customer for the S-42. The S-42 Pan Am Clipper surveyed the route from the US West Coast to China, making the first survey flight from Alameda, California to Pearl Harbor, Hawaii in April 1935.

According to Sikorsky, "Later on, another Pan American S-42 inaugurated the longest over ocean airline in the world from San Francisco to New Zealand. Finally in July, 1937, another S-42 Clipper made the first regular airline crossing of the North Atlantic Ocean starting from the United States, flying first to England by the northern route, and then to Portugal by the Bermuda-Azores route.

In March 1939 a Pan Am S-42 was scheduled to leave Miami at 0730, stop overnight in San Juan, Port of Spain, Belem and Recife, and arrive at Rio de Janeiro at 1530 on the fifth day. (It returned to Miami, and passengers to Buenos Aires continued on DC2/DC3s.)

In early 1942 the U.S. Navy acquired one S-42 which it used as a transport in the Caribbean and to South America.

All Sikorsky S-42s were either scrapped or destroyed in crashes.

In 1947, inventor Lemuel Stewart purchased the fuselage of S-42 NC-822M Brazilian Clipper from Pan Am for $750.00, converted it to a six-room houseboat, and kept it docked in a boat canal in Miami, Florida. Its ultimate fate is unknown.

Sikorsky S-42 aircraft of Pan American Airways
| Name | Image | Model | Registration | Delivered | Left service | Notes | Ref. |
|---|---|---|---|---|---|---|---|
| Brazilian Clipper | | S-42 | NC822M | May 1934 | Jul 15, 1946 | Purchased by Lemuel Stewart in 1947 and converted into a home. | |
| West Indies Clipper | | S-42 | NC823M | Dec 1934 | Aug 7, 1944 | Later renamed Pan American Clipper & surveyed trans-Pacific route, then re-named Hong Kong Clipper (1937). Sank at Antilla, Cuba. | |
| Puerto Rican Clipper | | S-42 | NC824M | May 1935 | Apr 11, 1936 | Swerved to miss boat during takeoff at Port of Spain & destroyed. | |
| Jamaica Clipper | | S-42A | NC15373 | Jul 1935 | Jul 15, 1946 | Scrapped in 1946. | |
| Antilles Clipper | | S-42A | NC15374 | Dec 1935 | Jul 15, 1946 | Scrapped in 1946. | |
| Brazilian Clipper | | S-42A | NC15375 | Feb 1936 | Jul 15, 1946 | Renamed Columbian Clipper. Scrapped in 1946. | |
| Dominican Clipper | | S-42A | NC15376 | Apr 1936 | Oct 3, 1941 | Broke up during landing at Port of San Juan. | |
| Pan American Clipper II | | S-42B | NC16734 | Sep 1936 | Jan 11, 1938 | Later renamed Samoan Clipper; lost in crash near Pago Pago which killed chief pilot Ed Musick. | |
| Bermuda Clipper | | S-42B | NC16735 | Sep 1936 | Dec 8, 1941 | Later renamed Alaska Clipper and then Hong Kong Clipper II; damaged beyond repair while parked at Kai Tak during Battle of Hong Kong. | |
| Pan American Clipper III | | S-42B | NC16736 | 1937 | Jul 27, 1943 | Later renamed Bermuda Clipper; destroyed in accidental fire during preparations for take-off at Manaus, Brazil. | |

== Variants ==
S-42
Production aircraft with four 700 hp (522 kW) Pratt & Whitney Hornet S5D1G radial engines, three built: NC 822M, NC 823M, NC 824M.
S-42A
Production aircraft with four 750 hp (559 kW) Pratt & Whitney Hornet S1EG radial engines, longer wings and a 2,000 lb (907 kg) increase in maximum takeoff weight, four built: NC 15373, NC 15374, NC 15375, NC 15376.
S-42B
Production aircraft with aerodynamic improvements, constant-speed Hamilton Standard propellers and a further 2,000 lb (907 kg) increase in maximum takeoff weight, three built: NC 16734, NC 16735, NC 16736.
British Marine BM-1
Proposed licence-built variant of the S-42A, not built.

== Notable accidents and incidents ==
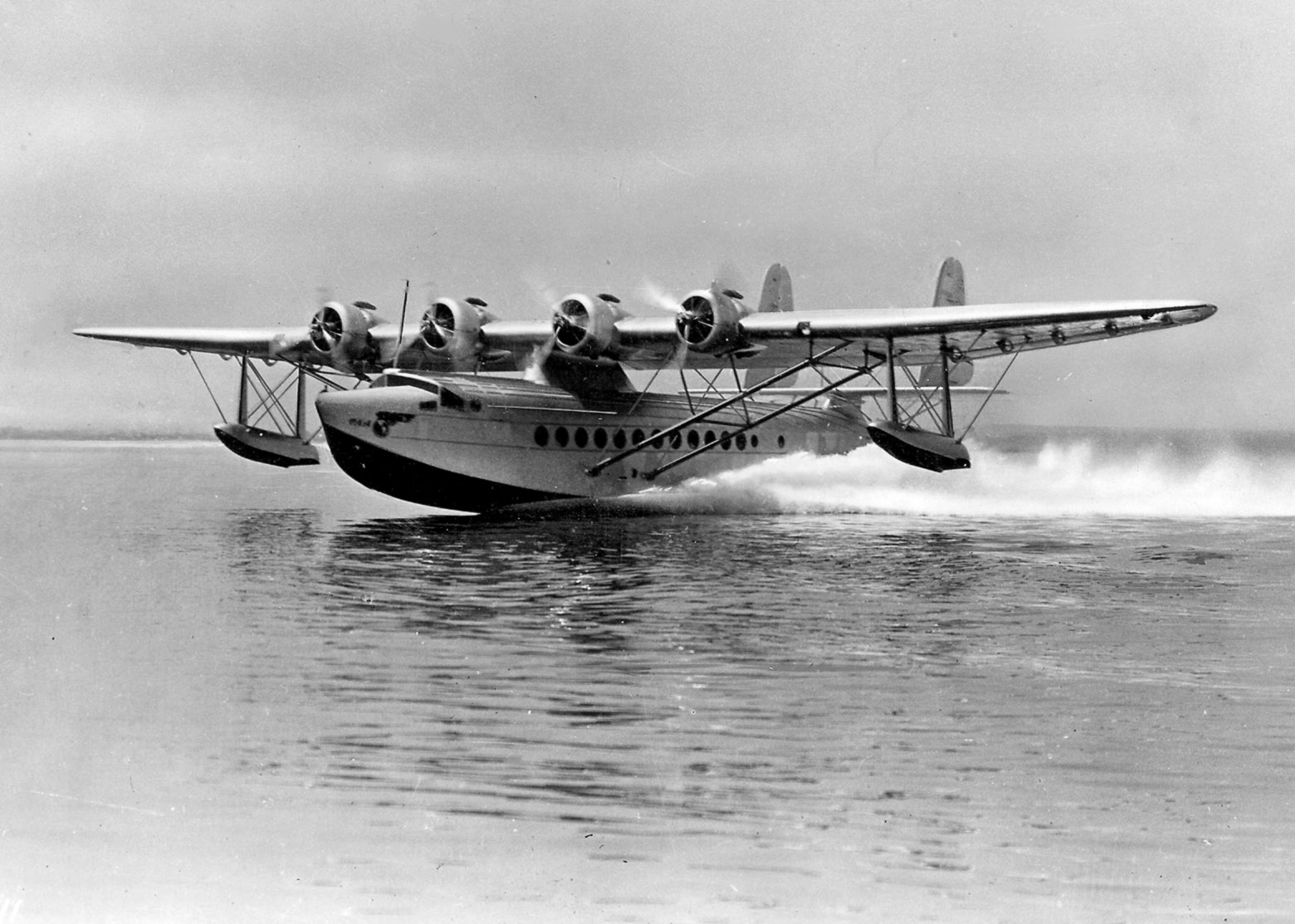
A PAA S-42 taking off

On April 11, 1936, a Pan Am S-42 crashed on takeoff from Port of Spain, Trinidad & Tobago, killing three of 25 on board. The pilot swerved to avoid a fishing boat that was in his path but one pontoon struck the boat and the aircraft overturned.

On January 11, 1938, Pan Am Flight 1, an S-42B named Samoan Clipper (formerly Pan American Clipper II), exploded near Pago Pago, American Samoa. The flying boat developed an engine problem shortly after takeoff. The pilot elected to dump fuel before making an emergency landing, but the aircraft exploded while fuel dumping was in progress. All seven crew members (including famous aviator Captain Ed Musick), died in the crash.

On October 3, 1941, Pam Am Flight 203, an S-42A named Dominican Clipper, crashed on landing in the harbour at San Juan, Puerto Rico, killing two of 27 on board. After the approach to San Juan, the aircraft hit the water in a nose-low attitude while moving sideways; after the first contact the aircraft swerved violently to the right and broke apart.

On December 8, 1941, a Pan Am S-42B named Hong Kong Clipper II (formerly Bermuda Clipper and Alaska Clipper) was destroyed on the water at Kai Tak Airport, Hong Kong, during a Japanese bombing raid.

On July 27, 1943, while docked at Manaus in Brazil a Pan Am S-42B named Bermuda Clipper (formerly Pan American Clipper III) developed an engine fire in response to which a flight engineer pulled the gas dump valve control instead of the fire extinguisher control. The expulsion of fuel spread the fire and the resulting inferno destroyed the aircraft. No one was killed or injured.

On August 8, 1944, Pan Am Flight 218, an S-42 named Hong Kong Clipper (formerly West Indies Clipper and Pan Am Clipper I) on a return trip from San Juan to Miami with intermediate stops at Port-au-Prince and Antilla, Cuba, crashed shortly after taking off from Antilla. After striking, bow first, the flying boat left the water in a slightly nose-high attitude, then returned, and by the third time, stalled. There were 17 fatalities (all passengers) out of the 26 passengers and five crew.

== Specifications (S-42) ==
Data from , Sikorsky S-42 Clipper History

General characteristics

- Crew: four
- Capacity: up to 32 day passengers or 16 sleeper berths
- Length: 67 ft 8 in (20.62 m)
- Wingspan: 114 ft 2 in (34.80 m)
- Height: 21 ft 9 in (6.63 m)
- Wing area: 1,330 sq ft (124 m^{2})
- Airfoil: Sikorsky GSM-3
- Empty weight: 19,764 lb (8,965 kg)
- Gross weight: 38,000 lb (17,237 kg)
- Powerplant: 4 × Pratt & Whitney R-1690 Hornet 9-cylinder air-cooled radial piston engines, 700 hp (520 kW) each
- Propellers: 3-bladed Hamilton Standard variable-pitch propellers

Performance

- Maximum speed: 182 mph (293 km/h, 158 kn) at 5,000 ft (1,500 m) at 38,000 lb (17,000 kg)

157 mph (136 kn; 253 km/h) at sea level on three engines

- Cruise speed: 160 mph (260 km/h, 140 kn) at 75% power at sea level

170 mph (150 kn; 270 km/h) at 70% power at 12,000 ft (3,700 m)
170 mph (150 kn; 270 km/h) at 75% power at sea level on three engines

- Stall speed: 65 mph (105 km/h, 56 kn)
- Range: 1,200 mi (1,900 km, 1,000 nmi)
- Ferry range: 3,000 mi (4,800 km, 2,600 nmi) with 800 lb (360 kg) payload at 12,000 ft (3,700 m) at 170 mph (150 kn; 270 km/h)
- Service ceiling: 15,704 ft (4,787 m)
- Rate of climb: 1,000 ft/min (5.1 m/s)

440 ft/min (130 m/min) on three engines

- Wing loading: 28.58 lb/sq ft (139.5 kg/m^{2})
- Power/mass: 13.57 lb/hp (8.25 kg/kW)

== See also ==
- Boeing 314
- Martin M-130
- Short Empire
- Samoan Clipper

Related development

- Sikorsky S-40
