= USS Avocet (AMCU-16) =

Ship's history

History

United States
- Ordered: 14 June 1944
- Launched: 14 July 1944
- Commissioned: 21 July 1944
- Decommissioned: 20 May 1955
- Reclassified: AMCU-16, 7 March 1952; MHC-16 while inactive
- Stricken: 1 January 1960
- Identification: IMO number: 7829388
- Fate: Unknown

General characteristics
- Class & type: LCIL-351
- Displacement: 387 (f.) tons
- Length: 159 ft 0 in (48.46 m)
- Beam: 23 ft 8 in (7.21 m)
- Draft: 5 ft 8 in (1.73 m)
- Speed: 14.4 k
- Complement: 40
- Armament: 5 x 20 mm machine guns

USS LCI(L)-653 was an LCI-351-class landing craft infantry built for the United States Navy during World War II. Decommissioned after the war, she was reactivated in 1953 as minehunter USS Avocet (AMCU-16). She was named for the avocet, a long-legged, web-footed shore bird possessing a slender, up-curved bill, found in western and southern states. She was sold in 1960 and her ultimate fate is unknown.

== Operational history ==
Avocet was laid down as LCI(L)-653 on 14 June 1944 at Barber, New Jersey, by the New Jersey Shipbuilding Corp.; launched on 14 July 1944; and commissioned on 21 July 1944.

=== World War II Pacific operations ===
Assigned to the Pacific during the last year of World War II, LCI(L)-653 served in the Philippines in the spring of 1945. She participated in the occupation of many of the smaller islands around Mindanao and of those that comprise the Sulu Archipelago.

=== Post-War operations ===
After the war, the ship returned to the United States and was placed out of commission, in reserve, on 6 June 1946. On 7 March 1952, LCI(L)-653 was reclassified as a minehunter and was named Avocet (AMCU-16). Her conversion began on 1 July 1953 at the Puget Sound Naval Shipyard, and she was recommissioned there on 9 December 1953.

=== Minesweeping operations ===
However, her return to active duty proved brief. For less than 15 months, Avocet operated out of San Diego conducting experiments for the Naval Electronics Laboratory. She also served as a sonar training ship and participated in mine hunting exercises. On 23 February 1955, she arrived in San Francisco where she began preparations for inactivation. While undergoing inactivation overhaul, she was reclassified as a coastal mine-hunter with the designation MHC-16. Avocet was towed to Stockton, California, on 5 May 1955 and was decommissioned there on 20 May 1955. Her disposal was approved on 21 December 1959, and her name was struck from the Navy Directory on 1 January 1960.

== Awards ==
Avocet earned one battle star during World War II as LCI(L)-653.
