= USS Avocet =

USS Avocet may refer to the following ships of the United States Navy:

- USS Avocet (AVP-4), laid down as Minesweeper No. 19 on 13 September 1917 at Baltimore, Maryland
- USS Avocet (AMCU-16), laid down as LCI(L)-653 on 14 June 1944 at Barber, New Jersey
