= Fautasi =

Samoan longboat

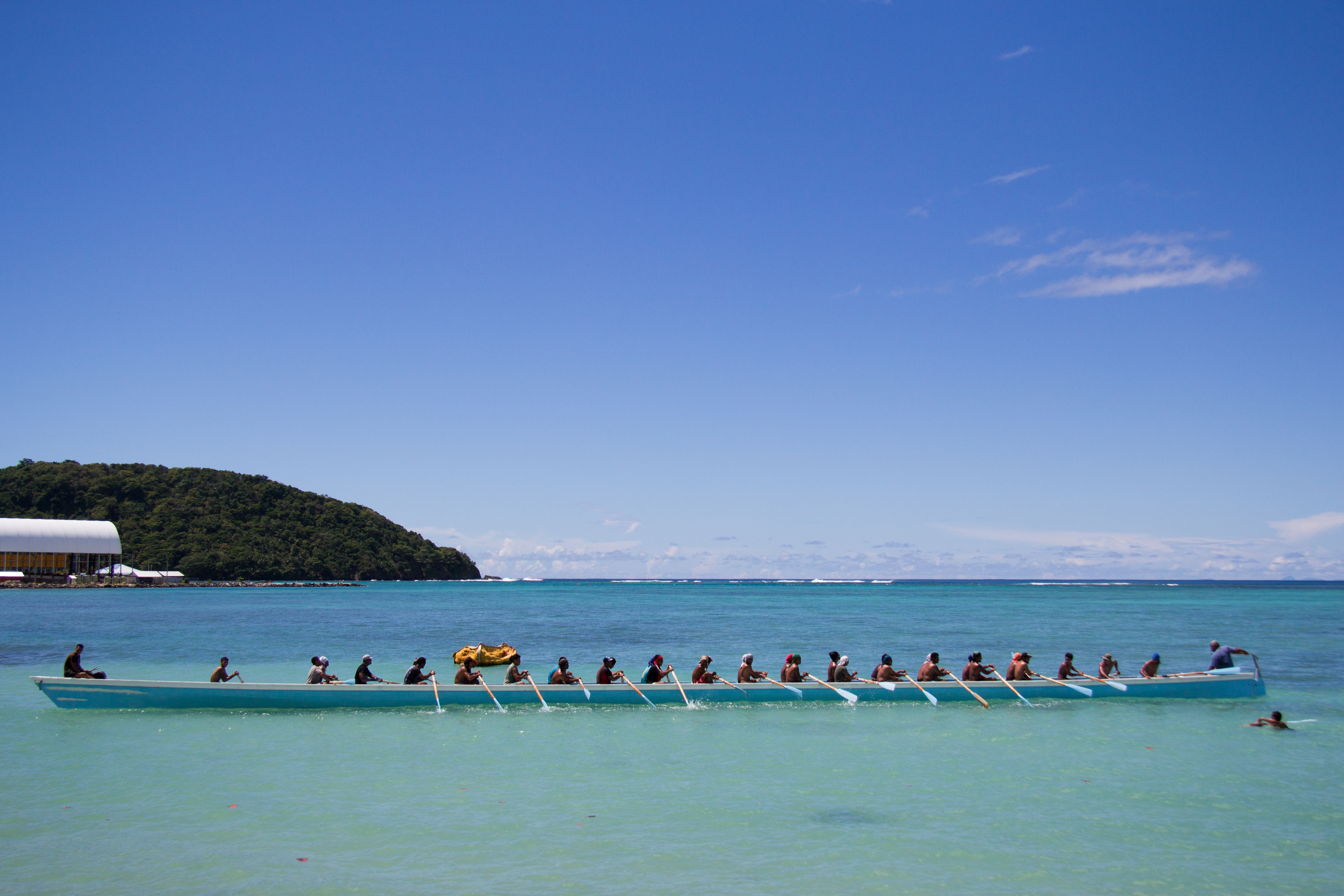
Training for fautasi races.

A fautasi (/ˌfɑːʊˈtɑːsi/ FAH-uu-TAH-see) is a Samoan boat, similar to a longboat. Fautasi boats are around 100 feet (30 m) in length and can accommodate a rowing crew of 50. A coxwain uses a drum to beat a tempo to coordinate the rowing. Each fautasi also has a captain. The meaning of fautasi is "to build as one," which reflects the structure of the boat build from one hollowed out tree, in contrast to a paopao. Prior to the use of modern-day ferries, fautasi were the main mode of transport between islands such as Upolu and Savai'i.

Today, fautasi are mainly used in racing events. Traditionally, men involved in the racing spent eight weeks away from their families and other luxuries, and training with their captain. The races take place during the Independent State of Samoa's Independence Days week celebrations in June. In American Samoa, the race take place during Flag Day marking the acceptance by the Samoans of the Deed of Cession. The sport is mainly a men-only sport (faaga tama), but in 2013, an all-women crew participated in the fautasi race. The first woman to become a fautasi Captain was Zita Martel in 2001. Entrants from Independent State of Samoa, American Samoa, Tonga and Hawaii have participated.

Fautasi are traditionally made of hollowed-out trees. More modern fautasi are made out of fiberglass which is more versatile.
