= Matafao Peak =

Mountain in American Samoa

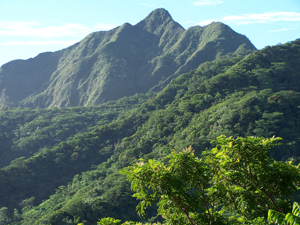

Highest point
- Elevation: 653 m (2,142 ft)
- Prominence: 653 m (2,142 ft)
- Coordinates: 14°17′41.64″S 170°42′7.92″W

Geography
- Location within American Samoa
- Location: American Samoa

Matafao Peak (Samoan: Fa’asi’usi’uga o Matafao) is a mountain in American Samoa, on the island of Tutuila. With an elevation of 2,142 feet (653 m), it is the highest peak on Tutuila Island. The mountain, like Rainmaker Mountain across Pago Pago Harbor, is a remnant of a volcanic plug and is part of the volcanic origins of the island. The mountain can be hiked from the high point of the Pago Pago-to-Fagasa Road. It is designated a National Natural Landmark above the 492-foot (150 m) level, an area known as Matafao Peak National Natural Landmark.

The village of Fagatogo is located at the foot of Mount Matafao.

== Etymology ==
The name “Matafao” is said to refer to the fact that, from its peak, in fair weather, one can see as far as Mount Fao on Upolu Island. The name of the mountain, Matafao, is derived from the Samoan language and translates into English as “Spear Head".

== Flora ==
Matafao Mountain is predominantly covered with montane scrub vegetation. The mountain hosts a diverse range of plant species, including Dipteris conjugata, Dicranopteris linearis, Machaerina falcata, Freycinetia storckii, and Davallia epiphylla. Among these, Dipteris, a fern with leaves resembling those of Tacca, is notably rare in the Samoan Islands and has been recorded only on Mount Matafao and Rainmaker Mountain. In contrast, Dicranopteris and Davallia are more common across the islands. Machaerina is a large sedge, while Freycinetia is a coarse-leaved climbing or scrambling vine also found in the cloud forests of Taʻū Island. The mountain also supports a variety of tree species, including Pandanus reineckei, Rapanea myricifolia, Syzygium brevifolium, Astronidium, Spiraeanthemum samoense, Alstonia godeffroyi, Eurya japonica, and Weinmannia affinis. Remarkably, nearly half of the characteristic tree species on Mount Matafao are endemic to Samoa. Two species, Astronidium and Cyrtandra geminata, are entirely restricted to the trachyte plugs of Tutuila Island, highlighting the ecological and conservation significance of Mount Matafao.

== Gallery ==
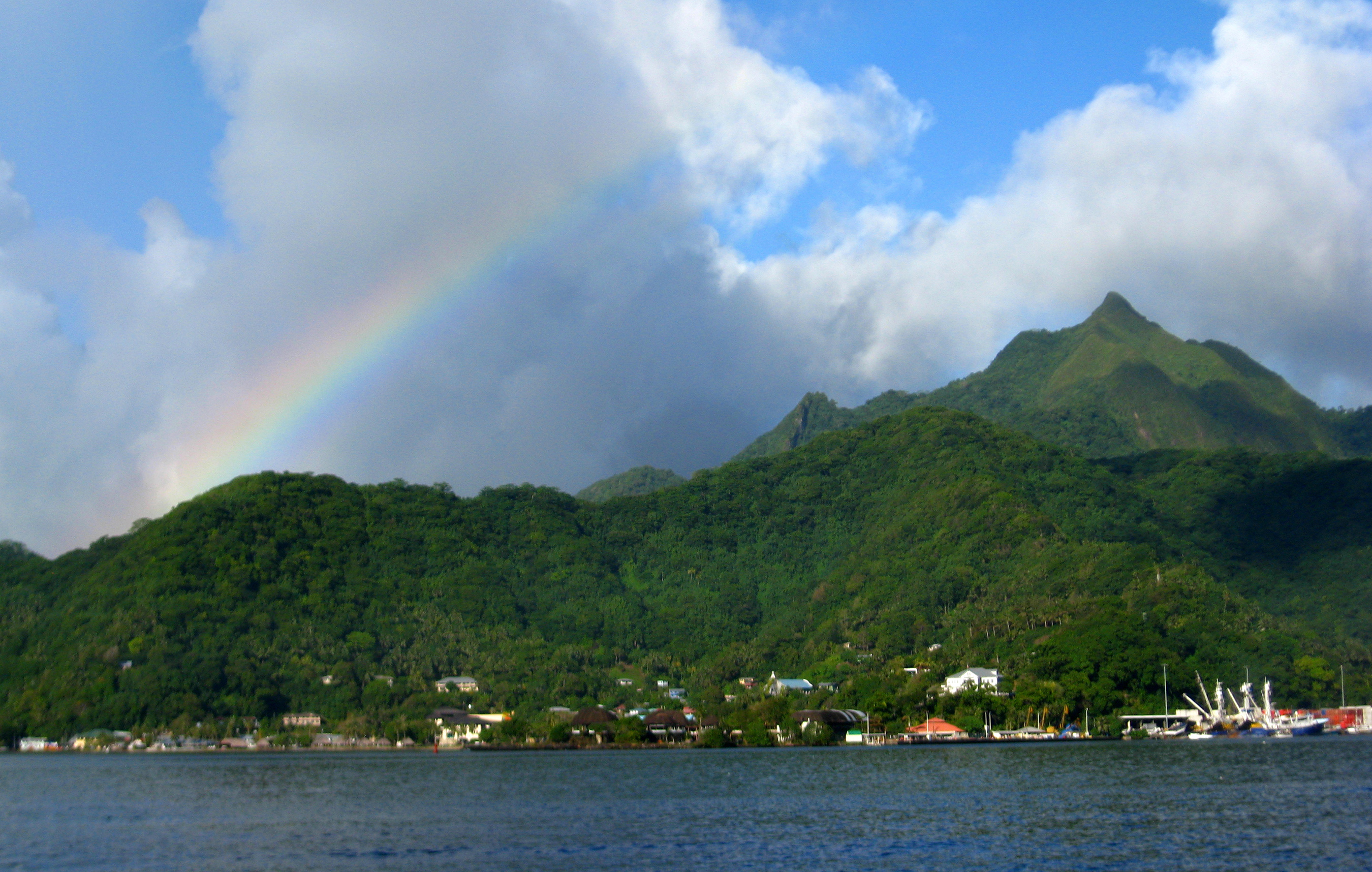

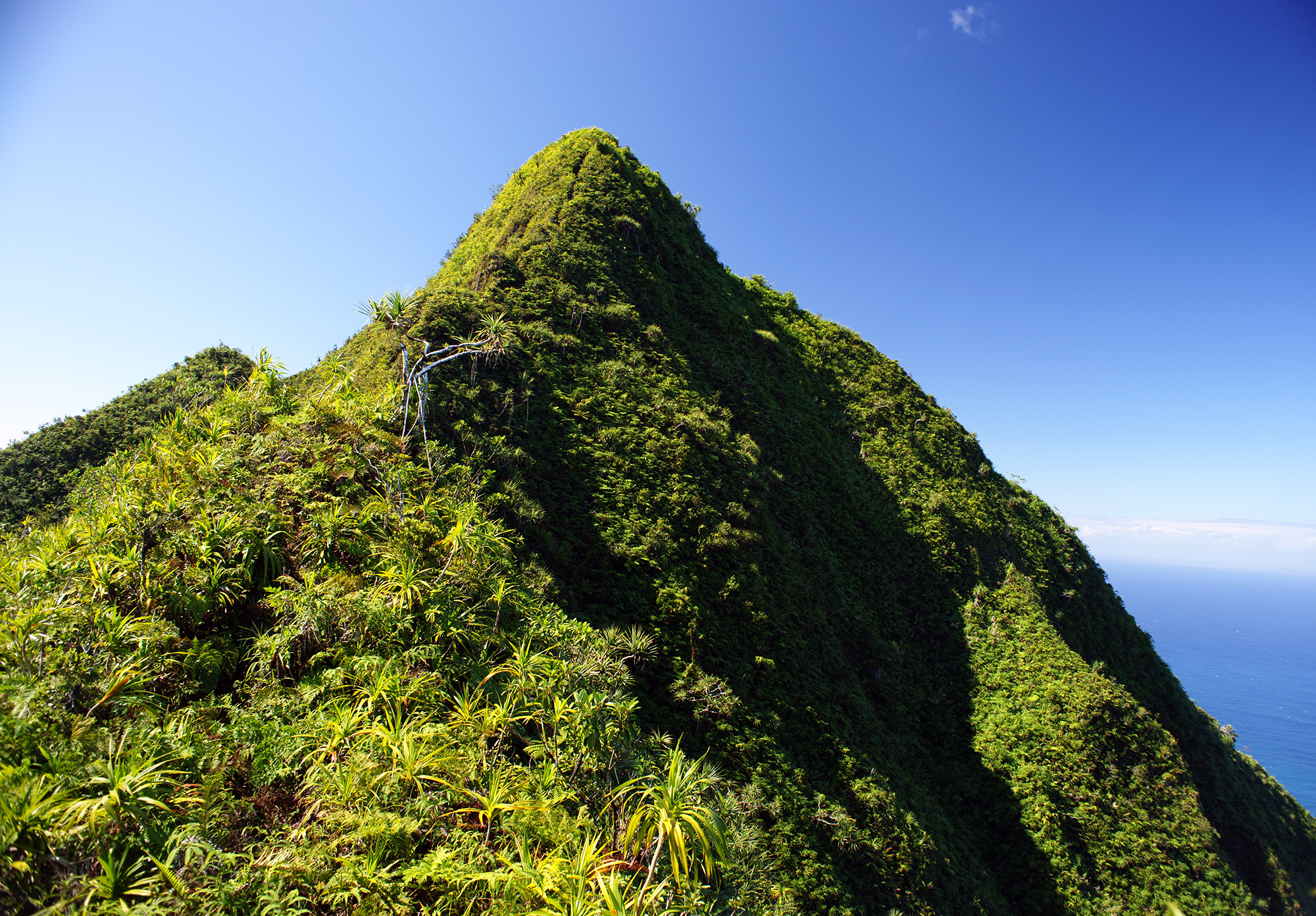

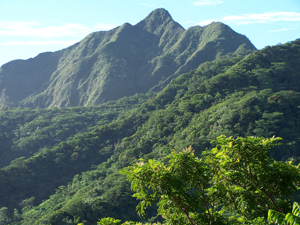

== See also ==
- List of National Natural Landmarks in American Samoa
